

145001–145100 

|-bgcolor=#fefefe
| 145001 ||  || — || March 11, 2005 || Kitt Peak || Spacewatch || — || align=right | 1.0 km || 
|-id=002 bgcolor=#fefefe
| 145002 ||  || — || March 11, 2005 || Mount Lemmon || Mount Lemmon Survey || — || align=right | 1.3 km || 
|-id=003 bgcolor=#fefefe
| 145003 ||  || — || March 13, 2005 || Catalina || CSS || V || align=right | 1.2 km || 
|-id=004 bgcolor=#fefefe
| 145004 ||  || — || March 13, 2005 || Catalina || CSS || — || align=right | 1.2 km || 
|-id=005 bgcolor=#E9E9E9
| 145005 ||  || — || March 4, 2005 || Catalina || CSS || — || align=right | 2.3 km || 
|-id=006 bgcolor=#fefefe
| 145006 ||  || — || March 7, 2005 || Siding Spring || SSS || V || align=right | 1.2 km || 
|-id=007 bgcolor=#E9E9E9
| 145007 ||  || — || March 10, 2005 || Anderson Mesa || LONEOS || — || align=right | 2.3 km || 
|-id=008 bgcolor=#fefefe
| 145008 ||  || — || March 11, 2005 || Catalina || CSS || — || align=right | 2.0 km || 
|-id=009 bgcolor=#fefefe
| 145009 ||  || — || March 12, 2005 || Kitt Peak || Spacewatch || — || align=right | 1.4 km || 
|-id=010 bgcolor=#fefefe
| 145010 ||  || — || March 4, 2005 || Mount Lemmon || Mount Lemmon Survey || — || align=right | 1.2 km || 
|-id=011 bgcolor=#E9E9E9
| 145011 ||  || — || March 10, 2005 || Anderson Mesa || LONEOS || — || align=right | 2.5 km || 
|-id=012 bgcolor=#d6d6d6
| 145012 ||  || — || March 10, 2005 || Anderson Mesa || LONEOS || — || align=right | 3.8 km || 
|-id=013 bgcolor=#fefefe
| 145013 ||  || — || March 11, 2005 || Kitt Peak || Spacewatch || — || align=right | 1.2 km || 
|-id=014 bgcolor=#E9E9E9
| 145014 ||  || — || March 11, 2005 || Kitt Peak || Spacewatch || — || align=right | 1.6 km || 
|-id=015 bgcolor=#fefefe
| 145015 ||  || — || March 11, 2005 || Mount Lemmon || Mount Lemmon Survey || — || align=right | 1.3 km || 
|-id=016 bgcolor=#E9E9E9
| 145016 ||  || — || March 11, 2005 || Catalina || CSS || — || align=right | 4.5 km || 
|-id=017 bgcolor=#fefefe
| 145017 ||  || — || March 12, 2005 || Kitt Peak || Spacewatch || NYS || align=right data-sort-value="0.96" | 960 m || 
|-id=018 bgcolor=#fefefe
| 145018 ||  || — || March 12, 2005 || Kitt Peak || Spacewatch || MAS || align=right | 1.1 km || 
|-id=019 bgcolor=#E9E9E9
| 145019 ||  || — || March 14, 2005 || Mount Lemmon || Mount Lemmon Survey || — || align=right | 3.3 km || 
|-id=020 bgcolor=#fefefe
| 145020 ||  || — || March 10, 2005 || Anderson Mesa || LONEOS || — || align=right | 1.7 km || 
|-id=021 bgcolor=#fefefe
| 145021 ||  || — || March 11, 2005 || Anderson Mesa || LONEOS || — || align=right | 1.8 km || 
|-id=022 bgcolor=#fefefe
| 145022 ||  || — || March 11, 2005 || Mount Lemmon || Mount Lemmon Survey || — || align=right | 1.8 km || 
|-id=023 bgcolor=#E9E9E9
| 145023 ||  || — || March 11, 2005 || Kitt Peak || Spacewatch || — || align=right | 1.1 km || 
|-id=024 bgcolor=#fefefe
| 145024 ||  || — || March 12, 2005 || Kitt Peak || Spacewatch || — || align=right data-sort-value="0.89" | 890 m || 
|-id=025 bgcolor=#fefefe
| 145025 ||  || — || March 13, 2005 || Kitt Peak || Spacewatch || NYS || align=right data-sort-value="0.93" | 930 m || 
|-id=026 bgcolor=#fefefe
| 145026 ||  || — || March 13, 2005 || Kitt Peak || Spacewatch || — || align=right | 1.5 km || 
|-id=027 bgcolor=#fefefe
| 145027 ||  || — || March 13, 2005 || Kitt Peak || Spacewatch || — || align=right | 1.1 km || 
|-id=028 bgcolor=#fefefe
| 145028 ||  || — || March 14, 2005 || Mount Lemmon || Mount Lemmon Survey || NYS || align=right data-sort-value="0.87" | 870 m || 
|-id=029 bgcolor=#fefefe
| 145029 ||  || — || March 15, 2005 || Mount Lemmon || Mount Lemmon Survey || V || align=right | 1.0 km || 
|-id=030 bgcolor=#E9E9E9
| 145030 ||  || — || March 13, 2005 || Anderson Mesa || LONEOS || — || align=right | 4.1 km || 
|-id=031 bgcolor=#E9E9E9
| 145031 ||  || — || March 11, 2005 || Kitt Peak || Spacewatch || — || align=right | 4.0 km || 
|-id=032 bgcolor=#fefefe
| 145032 ||  || — || March 3, 2005 || Kitt Peak || Spacewatch || — || align=right | 1.4 km || 
|-id=033 bgcolor=#fefefe
| 145033 ||  || — || March 8, 2005 || Kitt Peak || Spacewatch || — || align=right | 1.4 km || 
|-id=034 bgcolor=#fefefe
| 145034 ||  || — || March 9, 2005 || Anderson Mesa || LONEOS || V || align=right | 1.0 km || 
|-id=035 bgcolor=#fefefe
| 145035 ||  || — || March 10, 2005 || Anderson Mesa || LONEOS || — || align=right | 1.4 km || 
|-id=036 bgcolor=#E9E9E9
| 145036 ||  || — || March 10, 2005 || Kitt Peak || Spacewatch || GEF || align=right | 2.0 km || 
|-id=037 bgcolor=#fefefe
| 145037 ||  || — || March 10, 2005 || Catalina || CSS || V || align=right | 1.2 km || 
|-id=038 bgcolor=#fefefe
| 145038 ||  || — || March 12, 2005 || Socorro || LINEAR || V || align=right | 1.5 km || 
|-id=039 bgcolor=#fefefe
| 145039 ||  || — || March 10, 2005 || Mount Lemmon || Mount Lemmon Survey || — || align=right data-sort-value="0.80" | 800 m || 
|-id=040 bgcolor=#fefefe
| 145040 ||  || — || March 18, 2005 || RAS || A. Lowe || — || align=right | 1.3 km || 
|-id=041 bgcolor=#fefefe
| 145041 ||  || — || March 31, 2005 || Junk Bond || Junk Bond Obs. || V || align=right data-sort-value="0.79" | 790 m || 
|-id=042 bgcolor=#fefefe
| 145042 ||  || — || March 30, 2005 || Catalina || CSS || — || align=right | 1.5 km || 
|-id=043 bgcolor=#fefefe
| 145043 ||  || — || March 31, 2005 || Anderson Mesa || LONEOS || — || align=right | 1.5 km || 
|-id=044 bgcolor=#fefefe
| 145044 ||  || — || March 31, 2005 || Kitt Peak || Spacewatch || — || align=right | 1.4 km || 
|-id=045 bgcolor=#fefefe
| 145045 ||  || — || March 30, 2005 || Catalina || CSS || — || align=right | 2.0 km || 
|-id=046 bgcolor=#fefefe
| 145046 ||  || — || April 1, 2005 || Catalina || CSS || H || align=right data-sort-value="0.97" | 970 m || 
|-id=047 bgcolor=#E9E9E9
| 145047 ||  || — || April 1, 2005 || Kitt Peak || Spacewatch || GEF || align=right | 3.9 km || 
|-id=048 bgcolor=#fefefe
| 145048 ||  || — || April 1, 2005 || Kitt Peak || Spacewatch || FLO || align=right | 1.1 km || 
|-id=049 bgcolor=#fefefe
| 145049 ||  || — || April 1, 2005 || Kitt Peak || Spacewatch || — || align=right | 1.2 km || 
|-id=050 bgcolor=#fefefe
| 145050 ||  || — || April 1, 2005 || Anderson Mesa || LONEOS || — || align=right | 1.6 km || 
|-id=051 bgcolor=#E9E9E9
| 145051 ||  || — || April 1, 2005 || Kitt Peak || Spacewatch || — || align=right | 3.1 km || 
|-id=052 bgcolor=#fefefe
| 145052 ||  || — || April 1, 2005 || Anderson Mesa || LONEOS || V || align=right | 1.0 km || 
|-id=053 bgcolor=#E9E9E9
| 145053 ||  || — || April 1, 2005 || Anderson Mesa || LONEOS || — || align=right | 3.6 km || 
|-id=054 bgcolor=#fefefe
| 145054 ||  || — || April 1, 2005 || Anderson Mesa || LONEOS || FLO || align=right | 1.3 km || 
|-id=055 bgcolor=#fefefe
| 145055 ||  || — || April 1, 2005 || Anderson Mesa || LONEOS || FLO || align=right | 1.3 km || 
|-id=056 bgcolor=#fefefe
| 145056 ||  || — || April 1, 2005 || Anderson Mesa || LONEOS || — || align=right data-sort-value="0.99" | 990 m || 
|-id=057 bgcolor=#E9E9E9
| 145057 ||  || — || April 1, 2005 || Anderson Mesa || LONEOS || — || align=right | 2.2 km || 
|-id=058 bgcolor=#E9E9E9
| 145058 ||  || — || April 2, 2005 || Mount Lemmon || Mount Lemmon Survey || — || align=right | 4.9 km || 
|-id=059 bgcolor=#E9E9E9
| 145059 ||  || — || April 2, 2005 || Mount Lemmon || Mount Lemmon Survey || — || align=right | 2.7 km || 
|-id=060 bgcolor=#fefefe
| 145060 ||  || — || April 2, 2005 || Mount Lemmon || Mount Lemmon Survey || NYS || align=right data-sort-value="0.97" | 970 m || 
|-id=061 bgcolor=#fefefe
| 145061 ||  || — || April 3, 2005 || Palomar || NEAT || — || align=right | 1.1 km || 
|-id=062 bgcolor=#E9E9E9
| 145062 Hashikami ||  ||  || April 4, 2005 || Kitami || K. Endate || — || align=right | 4.3 km || 
|-id=063 bgcolor=#d6d6d6
| 145063 ||  || — || April 1, 2005 || Anderson Mesa || LONEOS || — || align=right | 5.7 km || 
|-id=064 bgcolor=#E9E9E9
| 145064 ||  || — || April 1, 2005 || Anderson Mesa || LONEOS || — || align=right | 5.3 km || 
|-id=065 bgcolor=#fefefe
| 145065 ||  || — || April 2, 2005 || Mount Lemmon || Mount Lemmon Survey || FLO || align=right data-sort-value="0.98" | 980 m || 
|-id=066 bgcolor=#E9E9E9
| 145066 ||  || — || April 2, 2005 || Mount Lemmon || Mount Lemmon Survey || MIS || align=right | 3.4 km || 
|-id=067 bgcolor=#fefefe
| 145067 ||  || — || April 3, 2005 || Palomar || NEAT || V || align=right data-sort-value="0.99" | 990 m || 
|-id=068 bgcolor=#fefefe
| 145068 ||  || — || April 4, 2005 || Catalina || CSS || V || align=right | 1.3 km || 
|-id=069 bgcolor=#fefefe
| 145069 ||  || — || April 4, 2005 || Catalina || CSS || — || align=right | 1.4 km || 
|-id=070 bgcolor=#fefefe
| 145070 ||  || — || April 4, 2005 || Socorro || LINEAR || — || align=right | 1.4 km || 
|-id=071 bgcolor=#E9E9E9
| 145071 ||  || — || April 4, 2005 || Socorro || LINEAR || — || align=right | 1.9 km || 
|-id=072 bgcolor=#fefefe
| 145072 ||  || — || April 4, 2005 || Socorro || LINEAR || — || align=right | 1.4 km || 
|-id=073 bgcolor=#fefefe
| 145073 ||  || — || April 4, 2005 || Mount Lemmon || Mount Lemmon Survey || — || align=right | 1.3 km || 
|-id=074 bgcolor=#fefefe
| 145074 ||  || — || April 5, 2005 || Anderson Mesa || LONEOS || — || align=right | 1.9 km || 
|-id=075 bgcolor=#E9E9E9
| 145075 Zipernowsky ||  ||  || April 6, 2005 || Piszkéstető || K. Sárneczky || — || align=right | 1.7 km || 
|-id=076 bgcolor=#fefefe
| 145076 ||  || — || April 2, 2005 || Anderson Mesa || LONEOS || MAS || align=right | 1.2 km || 
|-id=077 bgcolor=#fefefe
| 145077 ||  || — || April 3, 2005 || Siding Spring || SSS || — || align=right | 1.3 km || 
|-id=078 bgcolor=#fefefe
| 145078 Katherinejohnson ||  ||  || April 4, 2005 || Catalina || CSS || — || align=right | 1.5 km || 
|-id=079 bgcolor=#fefefe
| 145079 ||  || — || April 5, 2005 || Anderson Mesa || LONEOS || H || align=right | 1.2 km || 
|-id=080 bgcolor=#fefefe
| 145080 ||  || — || April 5, 2005 || Palomar || NEAT || FLO || align=right | 1.2 km || 
|-id=081 bgcolor=#fefefe
| 145081 ||  || — || April 5, 2005 || Mount Lemmon || Mount Lemmon Survey || NYS || align=right | 1.1 km || 
|-id=082 bgcolor=#E9E9E9
| 145082 ||  || — || April 5, 2005 || Mount Lemmon || Mount Lemmon Survey || — || align=right | 2.1 km || 
|-id=083 bgcolor=#E9E9E9
| 145083 ||  || — || April 2, 2005 || Mount Lemmon || Mount Lemmon Survey || GEF || align=right | 1.8 km || 
|-id=084 bgcolor=#fefefe
| 145084 ||  || — || April 2, 2005 || Mount Lemmon || Mount Lemmon Survey || V || align=right | 1.1 km || 
|-id=085 bgcolor=#E9E9E9
| 145085 ||  || — || April 4, 2005 || Socorro || LINEAR || RAF || align=right | 1.5 km || 
|-id=086 bgcolor=#E9E9E9
| 145086 ||  || — || April 4, 2005 || Mount Lemmon || Mount Lemmon Survey || — || align=right | 3.3 km || 
|-id=087 bgcolor=#fefefe
| 145087 ||  || — || April 5, 2005 || Mount Lemmon || Mount Lemmon Survey || FLO || align=right | 1.1 km || 
|-id=088 bgcolor=#fefefe
| 145088 ||  || — || April 5, 2005 || Mount Lemmon || Mount Lemmon Survey || NYS || align=right | 1.1 km || 
|-id=089 bgcolor=#fefefe
| 145089 ||  || — || April 5, 2005 || Catalina || CSS || H || align=right | 1.1 km || 
|-id=090 bgcolor=#fefefe
| 145090 ||  || — || April 9, 2005 || Siding Spring || SSS || H || align=right | 1.3 km || 
|-id=091 bgcolor=#fefefe
| 145091 ||  || — || April 2, 2005 || Catalina || CSS || — || align=right | 1.6 km || 
|-id=092 bgcolor=#fefefe
| 145092 ||  || — || April 2, 2005 || Mount Lemmon || Mount Lemmon Survey || V || align=right | 1.2 km || 
|-id=093 bgcolor=#E9E9E9
| 145093 ||  || — || April 4, 2005 || Catalina || CSS || MAR || align=right | 2.2 km || 
|-id=094 bgcolor=#E9E9E9
| 145094 ||  || — || April 4, 2005 || Catalina || CSS || — || align=right | 3.0 km || 
|-id=095 bgcolor=#d6d6d6
| 145095 ||  || — || April 4, 2005 || Catalina || CSS || — || align=right | 4.7 km || 
|-id=096 bgcolor=#fefefe
| 145096 ||  || — || April 5, 2005 || Anderson Mesa || LONEOS || — || align=right | 1.1 km || 
|-id=097 bgcolor=#fefefe
| 145097 ||  || — || April 5, 2005 || Socorro || LINEAR || FLO || align=right | 1.2 km || 
|-id=098 bgcolor=#E9E9E9
| 145098 ||  || — || April 4, 2005 || Catalina || CSS || DOR || align=right | 4.1 km || 
|-id=099 bgcolor=#E9E9E9
| 145099 ||  || — || April 5, 2005 || Anderson Mesa || LONEOS || — || align=right | 1.6 km || 
|-id=100 bgcolor=#fefefe
| 145100 ||  || — || April 5, 2005 || Mount Lemmon || Mount Lemmon Survey || V || align=right | 1.0 km || 
|}

145101–145200 

|-bgcolor=#E9E9E9
| 145101 ||  || — || April 5, 2005 || Mount Lemmon || Mount Lemmon Survey || — || align=right | 3.0 km || 
|-id=102 bgcolor=#fefefe
| 145102 ||  || — || April 6, 2005 || Kitt Peak || Spacewatch || ERI || align=right | 2.4 km || 
|-id=103 bgcolor=#fefefe
| 145103 ||  || — || April 6, 2005 || Kitt Peak || Spacewatch || — || align=right | 1.4 km || 
|-id=104 bgcolor=#fefefe
| 145104 ||  || — || April 9, 2005 || Kitt Peak || Spacewatch || — || align=right | 1.2 km || 
|-id=105 bgcolor=#fefefe
| 145105 ||  || — || April 9, 2005 || Socorro || LINEAR || SUL || align=right | 3.4 km || 
|-id=106 bgcolor=#E9E9E9
| 145106 ||  || — || April 10, 2005 || Kitt Peak || Spacewatch || — || align=right | 2.9 km || 
|-id=107 bgcolor=#fefefe
| 145107 ||  || — || April 10, 2005 || Kitt Peak || Spacewatch || — || align=right | 1.1 km || 
|-id=108 bgcolor=#E9E9E9
| 145108 ||  || — || April 6, 2005 || Catalina || CSS || — || align=right | 1.8 km || 
|-id=109 bgcolor=#fefefe
| 145109 ||  || — || April 9, 2005 || Mount Lemmon || Mount Lemmon Survey || NYS || align=right data-sort-value="0.98" | 980 m || 
|-id=110 bgcolor=#fefefe
| 145110 ||  || — || April 11, 2005 || Kitt Peak || Spacewatch || V || align=right | 1.2 km || 
|-id=111 bgcolor=#E9E9E9
| 145111 ||  || — || April 9, 2005 || Siding Spring || SSS || EUN || align=right | 1.9 km || 
|-id=112 bgcolor=#fefefe
| 145112 ||  || — || April 5, 2005 || Catalina || CSS || — || align=right | 1.1 km || 
|-id=113 bgcolor=#fefefe
| 145113 ||  || — || April 6, 2005 || Kitt Peak || Spacewatch || — || align=right | 1.2 km || 
|-id=114 bgcolor=#fefefe
| 145114 ||  || — || April 6, 2005 || Kitt Peak || Spacewatch || NYS || align=right data-sort-value="0.76" | 760 m || 
|-id=115 bgcolor=#E9E9E9
| 145115 ||  || — || April 9, 2005 || Catalina || CSS || — || align=right | 2.6 km || 
|-id=116 bgcolor=#fefefe
| 145116 ||  || — || April 11, 2005 || Mount Lemmon || Mount Lemmon Survey || — || align=right | 1.6 km || 
|-id=117 bgcolor=#E9E9E9
| 145117 ||  || — || April 7, 2005 || Kitt Peak || Spacewatch || — || align=right | 1.5 km || 
|-id=118 bgcolor=#fefefe
| 145118 ||  || — || April 7, 2005 || Kitt Peak || Spacewatch || MAS || align=right | 1.2 km || 
|-id=119 bgcolor=#E9E9E9
| 145119 ||  || — || April 10, 2005 || Kitt Peak || Spacewatch || — || align=right | 1.2 km || 
|-id=120 bgcolor=#E9E9E9
| 145120 ||  || — || April 10, 2005 || Mount Lemmon || Mount Lemmon Survey || — || align=right | 1.5 km || 
|-id=121 bgcolor=#E9E9E9
| 145121 ||  || — || April 10, 2005 || Kitt Peak || Spacewatch || — || align=right | 1.8 km || 
|-id=122 bgcolor=#fefefe
| 145122 ||  || — || April 10, 2005 || Kitt Peak || Spacewatch || — || align=right | 1.3 km || 
|-id=123 bgcolor=#fefefe
| 145123 ||  || — || April 12, 2005 || Socorro || LINEAR || — || align=right | 1.3 km || 
|-id=124 bgcolor=#E9E9E9
| 145124 ||  || — || April 12, 2005 || Mount Lemmon || Mount Lemmon Survey || NEM || align=right | 3.3 km || 
|-id=125 bgcolor=#fefefe
| 145125 ||  || — || April 9, 2005 || Socorro || LINEAR || V || align=right | 1.2 km || 
|-id=126 bgcolor=#fefefe
| 145126 ||  || — || April 11, 2005 || Mount Lemmon || Mount Lemmon Survey || V || align=right data-sort-value="0.97" | 970 m || 
|-id=127 bgcolor=#fefefe
| 145127 ||  || — || April 11, 2005 || Kitt Peak || Spacewatch || — || align=right | 1.2 km || 
|-id=128 bgcolor=#E9E9E9
| 145128 ||  || — || April 11, 2005 || Kitt Peak || Spacewatch || HOF || align=right | 4.8 km || 
|-id=129 bgcolor=#fefefe
| 145129 ||  || — || April 11, 2005 || Kitt Peak || Spacewatch || — || align=right | 1.3 km || 
|-id=130 bgcolor=#fefefe
| 145130 ||  || — || April 13, 2005 || Anderson Mesa || LONEOS || — || align=right | 1.5 km || 
|-id=131 bgcolor=#E9E9E9
| 145131 ||  || — || April 13, 2005 || Catalina || CSS || — || align=right | 3.2 km || 
|-id=132 bgcolor=#E9E9E9
| 145132 ||  || — || April 12, 2005 || Kitt Peak || Spacewatch || VIB || align=right | 3.2 km || 
|-id=133 bgcolor=#E9E9E9
| 145133 ||  || — || April 12, 2005 || Kitt Peak || Spacewatch || — || align=right | 2.2 km || 
|-id=134 bgcolor=#E9E9E9
| 145134 ||  || — || April 12, 2005 || Siding Spring || SSS || — || align=right | 1.9 km || 
|-id=135 bgcolor=#fefefe
| 145135 ||  || — || April 13, 2005 || Catalina || CSS || — || align=right | 1.4 km || 
|-id=136 bgcolor=#E9E9E9
| 145136 ||  || — || April 14, 2005 || Catalina || CSS || — || align=right | 3.5 km || 
|-id=137 bgcolor=#d6d6d6
| 145137 ||  || — || April 13, 2005 || Catalina || CSS || — || align=right | 5.7 km || 
|-id=138 bgcolor=#E9E9E9
| 145138 ||  || — || April 4, 2005 || Mount Lemmon || Mount Lemmon Survey || HNS || align=right | 2.4 km || 
|-id=139 bgcolor=#fefefe
| 145139 ||  || — || April 11, 2005 || Anderson Mesa || LONEOS || MAS || align=right data-sort-value="0.94" | 940 m || 
|-id=140 bgcolor=#E9E9E9
| 145140 ||  || — || April 11, 2005 || Mount Lemmon || Mount Lemmon Survey || — || align=right | 2.5 km || 
|-id=141 bgcolor=#E9E9E9
| 145141 ||  || — || April 11, 2005 || Mount Lemmon || Mount Lemmon Survey || — || align=right | 3.0 km || 
|-id=142 bgcolor=#E9E9E9
| 145142 ||  || — || April 12, 2005 || Kitt Peak || Spacewatch || — || align=right | 1.7 km || 
|-id=143 bgcolor=#fefefe
| 145143 ||  || — || April 12, 2005 || Socorro || LINEAR || — || align=right | 1.3 km || 
|-id=144 bgcolor=#d6d6d6
| 145144 ||  || — || April 12, 2005 || Siding Spring || SSS || TIR || align=right | 5.4 km || 
|-id=145 bgcolor=#E9E9E9
| 145145 ||  || — || April 13, 2005 || Anderson Mesa || LONEOS || — || align=right | 1.9 km || 
|-id=146 bgcolor=#fefefe
| 145146 ||  || — || April 14, 2005 || Kitt Peak || Spacewatch || — || align=right | 1.4 km || 
|-id=147 bgcolor=#E9E9E9
| 145147 ||  || — || April 14, 2005 || Catalina || CSS || — || align=right | 2.7 km || 
|-id=148 bgcolor=#E9E9E9
| 145148 ||  || — || April 14, 2005 || Kitt Peak || Spacewatch || — || align=right | 1.6 km || 
|-id=149 bgcolor=#fefefe
| 145149 ||  || — || April 15, 2005 || Kitt Peak || Spacewatch || NYS || align=right data-sort-value="0.78" | 780 m || 
|-id=150 bgcolor=#E9E9E9
| 145150 ||  || — || April 15, 2005 || Siding Spring || SSS || — || align=right | 2.8 km || 
|-id=151 bgcolor=#d6d6d6
| 145151 ||  || — || April 13, 2005 || Catalina || CSS || — || align=right | 3.6 km || 
|-id=152 bgcolor=#fefefe
| 145152 ||  || — || April 12, 2005 || Kitt Peak || Spacewatch || — || align=right | 1.2 km || 
|-id=153 bgcolor=#E9E9E9
| 145153 ||  || — || April 15, 2005 || Anderson Mesa || LONEOS || — || align=right | 1.9 km || 
|-id=154 bgcolor=#E9E9E9
| 145154 ||  || — || April 4, 2005 || Mount Lemmon || Mount Lemmon Survey || MIT || align=right | 1.8 km || 
|-id=155 bgcolor=#E9E9E9
| 145155 || 2005 HD || — || April 16, 2005 || Cordell-Lorenz || Cordell–Lorenz Obs. || — || align=right | 1.9 km || 
|-id=156 bgcolor=#E9E9E9
| 145156 || 2005 HO || — || April 16, 2005 || Kitt Peak || Spacewatch || — || align=right | 2.7 km || 
|-id=157 bgcolor=#fefefe
| 145157 ||  || — || April 16, 2005 || Kitt Peak || Spacewatch || — || align=right | 1.1 km || 
|-id=158 bgcolor=#fefefe
| 145158 ||  || — || April 28, 2005 || RAS || A. Lowe || — || align=right | 1.5 km || 
|-id=159 bgcolor=#fefefe
| 145159 ||  || — || April 27, 2005 || Campo Imperatore || CINEOS || FLO || align=right | 1.1 km || 
|-id=160 bgcolor=#d6d6d6
| 145160 ||  || — || April 30, 2005 || Kitt Peak || Spacewatch || — || align=right | 5.3 km || 
|-id=161 bgcolor=#E9E9E9
| 145161 ||  || — || April 30, 2005 || Kitt Peak || Spacewatch || — || align=right | 2.0 km || 
|-id=162 bgcolor=#d6d6d6
| 145162 ||  || — || April 30, 2005 || Kitt Peak || Spacewatch || — || align=right | 4.1 km || 
|-id=163 bgcolor=#E9E9E9
| 145163 ||  || — || April 28, 2005 || Siding Spring || SSS || — || align=right | 3.4 km || 
|-id=164 bgcolor=#E9E9E9
| 145164 ||  || — || April 30, 2005 || Siding Spring || SSS || — || align=right | 4.0 km || 
|-id=165 bgcolor=#fefefe
| 145165 ||  || — || April 30, 2005 || Kitt Peak || Spacewatch || — || align=right | 2.6 km || 
|-id=166 bgcolor=#fefefe
| 145166 Leojematt || 2005 JL ||  || May 3, 2005 || Wrightwood || J. W. Young || V || align=right data-sort-value="0.95" | 950 m || 
|-id=167 bgcolor=#fefefe
| 145167 ||  || — || May 3, 2005 || Socorro || LINEAR || V || align=right | 1.0 km || 
|-id=168 bgcolor=#E9E9E9
| 145168 ||  || — || May 3, 2005 || Catalina || CSS || — || align=right | 2.5 km || 
|-id=169 bgcolor=#fefefe
| 145169 ||  || — || May 3, 2005 || Catalina || CSS || — || align=right | 1.1 km || 
|-id=170 bgcolor=#fefefe
| 145170 ||  || — || May 5, 2005 || Palomar || NEAT || H || align=right data-sort-value="0.82" | 820 m || 
|-id=171 bgcolor=#fefefe
| 145171 ||  || — || May 2, 2005 || Kitt Peak || Spacewatch || — || align=right | 1.8 km || 
|-id=172 bgcolor=#E9E9E9
| 145172 ||  || — || May 2, 2005 || Kitt Peak || Spacewatch || — || align=right | 2.5 km || 
|-id=173 bgcolor=#fefefe
| 145173 ||  || — || May 4, 2005 || Kitt Peak || Spacewatch || V || align=right | 1.0 km || 
|-id=174 bgcolor=#E9E9E9
| 145174 Irenejoliotcurie ||  ||  || May 4, 2005 || Catalina || CSS || MAR || align=right | 1.7 km || 
|-id=175 bgcolor=#E9E9E9
| 145175 ||  || — || May 4, 2005 || Kitt Peak || Spacewatch || MAR || align=right | 1.3 km || 
|-id=176 bgcolor=#E9E9E9
| 145176 ||  || — || May 2, 2005 || Kitt Peak || Spacewatch || EUN || align=right | 2.3 km || 
|-id=177 bgcolor=#fefefe
| 145177 ||  || — || May 1, 2005 || Palomar || NEAT || — || align=right | 1.4 km || 
|-id=178 bgcolor=#fefefe
| 145178 ||  || — || May 1, 2005 || Palomar || NEAT || — || align=right | 1.2 km || 
|-id=179 bgcolor=#fefefe
| 145179 ||  || — || May 3, 2005 || Socorro || LINEAR || — || align=right | 1.4 km || 
|-id=180 bgcolor=#E9E9E9
| 145180 ||  || — || May 4, 2005 || Catalina || CSS || — || align=right | 3.7 km || 
|-id=181 bgcolor=#d6d6d6
| 145181 ||  || — || May 4, 2005 || Catalina || CSS || TIR || align=right | 5.1 km || 
|-id=182 bgcolor=#E9E9E9
| 145182 ||  || — || May 4, 2005 || Catalina || CSS || — || align=right | 4.3 km || 
|-id=183 bgcolor=#E9E9E9
| 145183 ||  || — || May 4, 2005 || Catalina || CSS || — || align=right | 1.8 km || 
|-id=184 bgcolor=#fefefe
| 145184 ||  || — || May 4, 2005 || Siding Spring || SSS || MAS || align=right | 1.3 km || 
|-id=185 bgcolor=#fefefe
| 145185 ||  || — || May 4, 2005 || Siding Spring || SSS || — || align=right | 1.2 km || 
|-id=186 bgcolor=#fefefe
| 145186 ||  || — || May 4, 2005 || Siding Spring || SSS || — || align=right data-sort-value="0.94" | 940 m || 
|-id=187 bgcolor=#E9E9E9
| 145187 ||  || — || May 1, 2005 || Siding Spring || SSS || — || align=right | 3.8 km || 
|-id=188 bgcolor=#E9E9E9
| 145188 ||  || — || May 3, 2005 || Kitt Peak || Spacewatch || — || align=right | 2.3 km || 
|-id=189 bgcolor=#fefefe
| 145189 ||  || — || May 3, 2005 || Kitt Peak || Spacewatch || NYS || align=right data-sort-value="0.83" | 830 m || 
|-id=190 bgcolor=#fefefe
| 145190 ||  || — || May 3, 2005 || Kitt Peak || Spacewatch || V || align=right data-sort-value="0.85" | 850 m || 
|-id=191 bgcolor=#E9E9E9
| 145191 ||  || — || May 3, 2005 || Socorro || LINEAR || — || align=right | 3.1 km || 
|-id=192 bgcolor=#E9E9E9
| 145192 ||  || — || May 3, 2005 || Socorro || LINEAR || — || align=right | 2.3 km || 
|-id=193 bgcolor=#E9E9E9
| 145193 ||  || — || May 3, 2005 || Catalina || CSS || — || align=right | 1.8 km || 
|-id=194 bgcolor=#E9E9E9
| 145194 ||  || — || May 3, 2005 || Catalina || CSS || EUN || align=right | 2.8 km || 
|-id=195 bgcolor=#E9E9E9
| 145195 ||  || — || May 4, 2005 || Kitt Peak || Spacewatch || WIT || align=right | 1.7 km || 
|-id=196 bgcolor=#E9E9E9
| 145196 ||  || — || May 4, 2005 || Anderson Mesa || LONEOS || — || align=right | 2.5 km || 
|-id=197 bgcolor=#E9E9E9
| 145197 ||  || — || May 4, 2005 || Mount Lemmon || Mount Lemmon Survey || — || align=right | 3.3 km || 
|-id=198 bgcolor=#fefefe
| 145198 ||  || — || May 4, 2005 || Socorro || LINEAR || — || align=right | 1.5 km || 
|-id=199 bgcolor=#d6d6d6
| 145199 ||  || — || May 4, 2005 || Socorro || LINEAR || — || align=right | 5.8 km || 
|-id=200 bgcolor=#fefefe
| 145200 ||  || — || May 4, 2005 || Socorro || LINEAR || — || align=right | 1.2 km || 
|}

145201–145300 

|-bgcolor=#E9E9E9
| 145201 ||  || — || May 4, 2005 || Mount Lemmon || Mount Lemmon Survey || — || align=right | 2.8 km || 
|-id=202 bgcolor=#E9E9E9
| 145202 ||  || — || May 4, 2005 || Mount Lemmon || Mount Lemmon Survey || CLO || align=right | 4.5 km || 
|-id=203 bgcolor=#E9E9E9
| 145203 ||  || — || May 4, 2005 || Mount Lemmon || Mount Lemmon Survey || AST || align=right | 2.6 km || 
|-id=204 bgcolor=#fefefe
| 145204 ||  || — || May 4, 2005 || Kitt Peak || Spacewatch || V || align=right | 1.1 km || 
|-id=205 bgcolor=#fefefe
| 145205 ||  || — || May 4, 2005 || Palomar || NEAT || — || align=right | 1.3 km || 
|-id=206 bgcolor=#fefefe
| 145206 ||  || — || May 4, 2005 || Palomar || NEAT || — || align=right | 1.6 km || 
|-id=207 bgcolor=#fefefe
| 145207 ||  || — || May 4, 2005 || Palomar || NEAT || NYS || align=right | 1.1 km || 
|-id=208 bgcolor=#E9E9E9
| 145208 ||  || — || May 6, 2005 || Haleakala || NEAT || MIT || align=right | 5.8 km || 
|-id=209 bgcolor=#d6d6d6
| 145209 ||  || — || May 7, 2005 || Kitt Peak || Spacewatch || — || align=right | 3.0 km || 
|-id=210 bgcolor=#E9E9E9
| 145210 ||  || — || May 7, 2005 || Kitt Peak || Spacewatch || — || align=right | 4.2 km || 
|-id=211 bgcolor=#fefefe
| 145211 ||  || — || May 7, 2005 || Mount Lemmon || Mount Lemmon Survey || — || align=right | 1.2 km || 
|-id=212 bgcolor=#E9E9E9
| 145212 ||  || — || May 4, 2005 || Socorro || LINEAR || ADE || align=right | 2.1 km || 
|-id=213 bgcolor=#fefefe
| 145213 ||  || — || May 4, 2005 || Socorro || LINEAR || V || align=right | 1.2 km || 
|-id=214 bgcolor=#E9E9E9
| 145214 ||  || — || May 4, 2005 || Palomar || NEAT || — || align=right | 5.7 km || 
|-id=215 bgcolor=#fefefe
| 145215 ||  || — || May 3, 2005 || Kitt Peak || Spacewatch || FLO || align=right data-sort-value="0.62" | 620 m || 
|-id=216 bgcolor=#E9E9E9
| 145216 ||  || — || May 3, 2005 || Kitt Peak || Spacewatch || — || align=right | 2.8 km || 
|-id=217 bgcolor=#E9E9E9
| 145217 ||  || — || May 3, 2005 || Socorro || LINEAR || — || align=right | 3.4 km || 
|-id=218 bgcolor=#E9E9E9
| 145218 ||  || — || May 4, 2005 || Kitt Peak || Spacewatch || — || align=right | 3.5 km || 
|-id=219 bgcolor=#d6d6d6
| 145219 ||  || — || May 4, 2005 || Catalina || CSS || — || align=right | 5.8 km || 
|-id=220 bgcolor=#d6d6d6
| 145220 ||  || — || May 6, 2005 || Socorro || LINEAR || — || align=right | 6.4 km || 
|-id=221 bgcolor=#E9E9E9
| 145221 ||  || — || May 7, 2005 || Kitt Peak || Spacewatch || PAD || align=right | 3.6 km || 
|-id=222 bgcolor=#E9E9E9
| 145222 ||  || — || May 8, 2005 || Mount Lemmon || Mount Lemmon Survey || DOR || align=right | 4.2 km || 
|-id=223 bgcolor=#fefefe
| 145223 ||  || — || May 8, 2005 || Siding Spring || SSS || V || align=right | 1.0 km || 
|-id=224 bgcolor=#E9E9E9
| 145224 ||  || — || May 10, 2005 || Catalina || CSS || — || align=right | 4.2 km || 
|-id=225 bgcolor=#fefefe
| 145225 ||  || — || May 4, 2005 || Palomar || NEAT || V || align=right | 1.1 km || 
|-id=226 bgcolor=#E9E9E9
| 145226 ||  || — || May 4, 2005 || Catalina || CSS || — || align=right | 2.1 km || 
|-id=227 bgcolor=#E9E9E9
| 145227 ||  || — || May 4, 2005 || Catalina || CSS || — || align=right | 2.5 km || 
|-id=228 bgcolor=#E9E9E9
| 145228 ||  || — || May 6, 2005 || Socorro || LINEAR || — || align=right | 4.3 km || 
|-id=229 bgcolor=#E9E9E9
| 145229 ||  || — || May 7, 2005 || Catalina || CSS || — || align=right | 1.7 km || 
|-id=230 bgcolor=#fefefe
| 145230 ||  || — || May 9, 2005 || Catalina || CSS || — || align=right | 1.7 km || 
|-id=231 bgcolor=#d6d6d6
| 145231 ||  || — || May 10, 2005 || Anderson Mesa || LONEOS || LIX || align=right | 6.0 km || 
|-id=232 bgcolor=#fefefe
| 145232 ||  || — || May 10, 2005 || Mount Lemmon || Mount Lemmon Survey || — || align=right | 1.3 km || 
|-id=233 bgcolor=#d6d6d6
| 145233 ||  || — || May 10, 2005 || Mount Lemmon || Mount Lemmon Survey || — || align=right | 3.1 km || 
|-id=234 bgcolor=#d6d6d6
| 145234 ||  || — || May 10, 2005 || Kitt Peak || Spacewatch || — || align=right | 5.0 km || 
|-id=235 bgcolor=#E9E9E9
| 145235 ||  || — || May 8, 2005 || Kitt Peak || Spacewatch || HEN || align=right | 1.3 km || 
|-id=236 bgcolor=#E9E9E9
| 145236 ||  || — || May 8, 2005 || Mount Lemmon || Mount Lemmon Survey || — || align=right | 2.0 km || 
|-id=237 bgcolor=#fefefe
| 145237 ||  || — || May 8, 2005 || Socorro || LINEAR || — || align=right | 1.5 km || 
|-id=238 bgcolor=#d6d6d6
| 145238 ||  || — || May 9, 2005 || Anderson Mesa || LONEOS || EOS || align=right | 2.7 km || 
|-id=239 bgcolor=#E9E9E9
| 145239 ||  || — || May 11, 2005 || Palomar || NEAT || — || align=right | 3.1 km || 
|-id=240 bgcolor=#E9E9E9
| 145240 ||  || — || May 8, 2005 || Siding Spring || SSS || — || align=right | 3.0 km || 
|-id=241 bgcolor=#fefefe
| 145241 ||  || — || May 10, 2005 || Mount Lemmon || Mount Lemmon Survey || MAS || align=right | 1.2 km || 
|-id=242 bgcolor=#E9E9E9
| 145242 ||  || — || May 11, 2005 || Palomar || NEAT || — || align=right | 3.3 km || 
|-id=243 bgcolor=#fefefe
| 145243 ||  || — || May 8, 2005 || Kitt Peak || Spacewatch || — || align=right | 1.1 km || 
|-id=244 bgcolor=#d6d6d6
| 145244 ||  || — || May 8, 2005 || Anderson Mesa || LONEOS || — || align=right | 5.5 km || 
|-id=245 bgcolor=#d6d6d6
| 145245 ||  || — || May 9, 2005 || Catalina || CSS || — || align=right | 2.9 km || 
|-id=246 bgcolor=#fefefe
| 145246 ||  || — || May 10, 2005 || Kitt Peak || Spacewatch || MAS || align=right | 1.2 km || 
|-id=247 bgcolor=#E9E9E9
| 145247 ||  || — || May 11, 2005 || Catalina || CSS || — || align=right | 1.6 km || 
|-id=248 bgcolor=#fefefe
| 145248 ||  || — || May 11, 2005 || Mount Lemmon || Mount Lemmon Survey || — || align=right | 1.0 km || 
|-id=249 bgcolor=#fefefe
| 145249 ||  || — || May 3, 2005 || Reedy Creek || J. Broughton || NYS || align=right | 1.1 km || 
|-id=250 bgcolor=#E9E9E9
| 145250 ||  || — || May 9, 2005 || Catalina || CSS || DOR || align=right | 3.4 km || 
|-id=251 bgcolor=#E9E9E9
| 145251 ||  || — || May 9, 2005 || Socorro || LINEAR || — || align=right | 1.8 km || 
|-id=252 bgcolor=#fefefe
| 145252 ||  || — || May 10, 2005 || Kitt Peak || Spacewatch || V || align=right | 1.1 km || 
|-id=253 bgcolor=#E9E9E9
| 145253 ||  || — || May 10, 2005 || Kitt Peak || Spacewatch || — || align=right | 1.6 km || 
|-id=254 bgcolor=#E9E9E9
| 145254 ||  || — || May 10, 2005 || Kitt Peak || Spacewatch || WIT || align=right | 1.8 km || 
|-id=255 bgcolor=#E9E9E9
| 145255 ||  || — || May 10, 2005 || Kitt Peak || Spacewatch || — || align=right | 4.8 km || 
|-id=256 bgcolor=#d6d6d6
| 145256 ||  || — || May 11, 2005 || Kitt Peak || Spacewatch || — || align=right | 5.7 km || 
|-id=257 bgcolor=#d6d6d6
| 145257 ||  || — || May 12, 2005 || Socorro || LINEAR || EOS || align=right | 3.0 km || 
|-id=258 bgcolor=#E9E9E9
| 145258 ||  || — || May 12, 2005 || Socorro || LINEAR || — || align=right | 3.3 km || 
|-id=259 bgcolor=#d6d6d6
| 145259 ||  || — || May 12, 2005 || Kitt Peak || Spacewatch || — || align=right | 6.1 km || 
|-id=260 bgcolor=#E9E9E9
| 145260 ||  || — || May 12, 2005 || Socorro || LINEAR || — || align=right | 2.3 km || 
|-id=261 bgcolor=#E9E9E9
| 145261 ||  || — || May 13, 2005 || Socorro || LINEAR || — || align=right | 2.9 km || 
|-id=262 bgcolor=#fefefe
| 145262 ||  || — || May 13, 2005 || Mount Lemmon || Mount Lemmon Survey || — || align=right | 1.4 km || 
|-id=263 bgcolor=#E9E9E9
| 145263 ||  || — || May 14, 2005 || Kitt Peak || Spacewatch || — || align=right | 1.5 km || 
|-id=264 bgcolor=#E9E9E9
| 145264 ||  || — || May 14, 2005 || Kitt Peak || Spacewatch || NEM || align=right | 2.7 km || 
|-id=265 bgcolor=#d6d6d6
| 145265 ||  || — || May 14, 2005 || Kitt Peak || Spacewatch || — || align=right | 3.7 km || 
|-id=266 bgcolor=#E9E9E9
| 145266 ||  || — || May 14, 2005 || Socorro || LINEAR || EUN || align=right | 2.4 km || 
|-id=267 bgcolor=#d6d6d6
| 145267 ||  || — || May 14, 2005 || Mount Lemmon || Mount Lemmon Survey || — || align=right | 3.6 km || 
|-id=268 bgcolor=#d6d6d6
| 145268 ||  || — || May 12, 2005 || Catalina || CSS || LIX || align=right | 5.2 km || 
|-id=269 bgcolor=#d6d6d6
| 145269 ||  || — || May 13, 2005 || Kitt Peak || Spacewatch || LIX || align=right | 6.2 km || 
|-id=270 bgcolor=#d6d6d6
| 145270 ||  || — || May 13, 2005 || Kitt Peak || Spacewatch || — || align=right | 4.6 km || 
|-id=271 bgcolor=#fefefe
| 145271 ||  || — || May 13, 2005 || Mount Lemmon || Mount Lemmon Survey || — || align=right | 1.1 km || 
|-id=272 bgcolor=#d6d6d6
| 145272 ||  || — || May 13, 2005 || Catalina || CSS || EUP || align=right | 6.1 km || 
|-id=273 bgcolor=#E9E9E9
| 145273 ||  || — || May 13, 2005 || Siding Spring || SSS || — || align=right | 2.5 km || 
|-id=274 bgcolor=#fefefe
| 145274 ||  || — || May 14, 2005 || Socorro || LINEAR || V || align=right | 1.2 km || 
|-id=275 bgcolor=#E9E9E9
| 145275 ||  || — || May 14, 2005 || Catalina || CSS || EUN || align=right | 1.9 km || 
|-id=276 bgcolor=#E9E9E9
| 145276 ||  || — || May 15, 2005 || Mount Lemmon || Mount Lemmon Survey || — || align=right | 2.4 km || 
|-id=277 bgcolor=#E9E9E9
| 145277 ||  || — || May 13, 2005 || Catalina || CSS || ADE || align=right | 5.6 km || 
|-id=278 bgcolor=#fefefe
| 145278 ||  || — || May 14, 2005 || Mount Lemmon || Mount Lemmon Survey || V || align=right data-sort-value="0.99" | 990 m || 
|-id=279 bgcolor=#E9E9E9
| 145279 ||  || — || May 15, 2005 || Mount Lemmon || Mount Lemmon Survey || — || align=right | 1.8 km || 
|-id=280 bgcolor=#E9E9E9
| 145280 ||  || — || May 13, 2005 || Catalina || CSS || ADE || align=right | 5.1 km || 
|-id=281 bgcolor=#fefefe
| 145281 ||  || — || May 4, 2005 || Mount Lemmon || Mount Lemmon Survey || MAS || align=right | 1.1 km || 
|-id=282 bgcolor=#d6d6d6
| 145282 ||  || — || May 7, 2005 || Kitt Peak || Spacewatch || EOS || align=right | 3.2 km || 
|-id=283 bgcolor=#fefefe
| 145283 ||  || — || May 8, 2005 || Mount Lemmon || Mount Lemmon Survey || — || align=right | 1.1 km || 
|-id=284 bgcolor=#fefefe
| 145284 ||  || — || May 11, 2005 || Mount Lemmon || Mount Lemmon Survey || — || align=right data-sort-value="0.92" | 920 m || 
|-id=285 bgcolor=#E9E9E9
| 145285 ||  || — || May 12, 2005 || Socorro || LINEAR || — || align=right | 1.8 km || 
|-id=286 bgcolor=#E9E9E9
| 145286 ||  || — || May 12, 2005 || Palomar || NEAT || — || align=right | 2.7 km || 
|-id=287 bgcolor=#fefefe
| 145287 ||  || — || May 2, 2005 || Catalina || CSS || H || align=right data-sort-value="0.95" | 950 m || 
|-id=288 bgcolor=#fefefe
| 145288 ||  || — || May 7, 2005 || Mount Lemmon || Mount Lemmon Survey || — || align=right | 1.1 km || 
|-id=289 bgcolor=#E9E9E9
| 145289 ||  || — || May 8, 2005 || Mount Lemmon || Mount Lemmon Survey || — || align=right | 2.0 km || 
|-id=290 bgcolor=#fefefe
| 145290 ||  || — || May 8, 2005 || Mount Lemmon || Mount Lemmon Survey || — || align=right | 1.4 km || 
|-id=291 bgcolor=#fefefe
| 145291 ||  || — || May 11, 2005 || Mount Lemmon || Mount Lemmon Survey || FLO || align=right data-sort-value="0.76" | 760 m || 
|-id=292 bgcolor=#E9E9E9
| 145292 ||  || — || May 14, 2005 || Palomar || NEAT || — || align=right | 1.7 km || 
|-id=293 bgcolor=#E9E9E9
| 145293 || 2005 KE || — || May 16, 2005 || Reedy Creek || J. Broughton || — || align=right | 5.5 km || 
|-id=294 bgcolor=#d6d6d6
| 145294 ||  || — || May 16, 2005 || Palomar || NEAT || — || align=right | 9.4 km || 
|-id=295 bgcolor=#fefefe
| 145295 ||  || — || May 18, 2005 || Palomar || NEAT || — || align=right | 1.3 km || 
|-id=296 bgcolor=#E9E9E9
| 145296 ||  || — || May 19, 2005 || Siding Spring || SSS || — || align=right | 1.8 km || 
|-id=297 bgcolor=#d6d6d6
| 145297 ||  || — || May 19, 2005 || Mount Lemmon || Mount Lemmon Survey || EOS || align=right | 3.0 km || 
|-id=298 bgcolor=#E9E9E9
| 145298 ||  || — || May 20, 2005 || Mount Lemmon || Mount Lemmon Survey || — || align=right | 2.2 km || 
|-id=299 bgcolor=#E9E9E9
| 145299 ||  || — || May 20, 2005 || Mount Lemmon || Mount Lemmon Survey || — || align=right | 2.0 km || 
|-id=300 bgcolor=#fefefe
| 145300 ||  || — || May 21, 2005 || Mount Lemmon || Mount Lemmon Survey || V || align=right | 1.2 km || 
|}

145301–145400 

|-bgcolor=#E9E9E9
| 145301 ||  || — || May 20, 2005 || Mount Lemmon || Mount Lemmon Survey || JUN || align=right | 2.2 km || 
|-id=302 bgcolor=#E9E9E9
| 145302 ||  || — || May 16, 2005 || Mount Lemmon || Mount Lemmon Survey || — || align=right | 1.5 km || 
|-id=303 bgcolor=#fefefe
| 145303 ||  || — || May 28, 2005 || Reedy Creek || J. Broughton || — || align=right | 1.2 km || 
|-id=304 bgcolor=#fefefe
| 145304 ||  || — || May 30, 2005 || Reedy Creek || J. Broughton || CIM || align=right | 3.7 km || 
|-id=305 bgcolor=#fefefe
| 145305 ||  || — || May 31, 2005 || Anderson Mesa || LONEOS || — || align=right | 1.7 km || 
|-id=306 bgcolor=#fefefe
| 145306 ||  || — || May 28, 2005 || Campo Imperatore || CINEOS || — || align=right | 1.3 km || 
|-id=307 bgcolor=#E9E9E9
| 145307 ||  || — || May 31, 2005 || Anderson Mesa || LONEOS || — || align=right | 1.9 km || 
|-id=308 bgcolor=#fefefe
| 145308 ||  || — || June 1, 2005 || Reedy Creek || J. Broughton || NYS || align=right | 1.1 km || 
|-id=309 bgcolor=#fefefe
| 145309 ||  || — || June 1, 2005 || Reedy Creek || J. Broughton || NYS || align=right | 1.1 km || 
|-id=310 bgcolor=#fefefe
| 145310 ||  || — || June 1, 2005 || Reedy Creek || J. Broughton || V || align=right data-sort-value="0.94" | 940 m || 
|-id=311 bgcolor=#E9E9E9
| 145311 ||  || — || June 3, 2005 || Reedy Creek || J. Broughton || EUN || align=right | 2.6 km || 
|-id=312 bgcolor=#d6d6d6
| 145312 ||  || — || June 3, 2005 || Siding Spring || SSS || — || align=right | 5.1 km || 
|-id=313 bgcolor=#E9E9E9
| 145313 ||  || — || June 3, 2005 || Catalina || CSS || JUN || align=right | 3.0 km || 
|-id=314 bgcolor=#fefefe
| 145314 ||  || — || June 1, 2005 || Kitt Peak || Spacewatch || NYS || align=right | 1.0 km || 
|-id=315 bgcolor=#fefefe
| 145315 ||  || — || June 2, 2005 || Siding Spring || SSS || — || align=right | 1.3 km || 
|-id=316 bgcolor=#E9E9E9
| 145316 ||  || — || June 3, 2005 || Catalina || CSS || NEM || align=right | 3.6 km || 
|-id=317 bgcolor=#E9E9E9
| 145317 ||  || — || June 3, 2005 || Siding Spring || SSS || — || align=right | 2.4 km || 
|-id=318 bgcolor=#E9E9E9
| 145318 ||  || — || June 4, 2005 || Kitt Peak || Spacewatch || WIT || align=right | 1.4 km || 
|-id=319 bgcolor=#E9E9E9
| 145319 ||  || — || June 4, 2005 || Kitt Peak || Spacewatch || — || align=right | 1.8 km || 
|-id=320 bgcolor=#E9E9E9
| 145320 ||  || — || June 5, 2005 || Kitt Peak || Spacewatch || AGN || align=right | 1.7 km || 
|-id=321 bgcolor=#d6d6d6
| 145321 ||  || — || June 8, 2005 || Kitt Peak || Spacewatch || CHA || align=right | 3.0 km || 
|-id=322 bgcolor=#d6d6d6
| 145322 ||  || — || June 8, 2005 || Kitt Peak || Spacewatch || — || align=right | 3.8 km || 
|-id=323 bgcolor=#d6d6d6
| 145323 ||  || — || June 8, 2005 || Kitt Peak || Spacewatch || — || align=right | 7.2 km || 
|-id=324 bgcolor=#fefefe
| 145324 ||  || — || June 8, 2005 || Kitt Peak || Spacewatch || — || align=right | 1.2 km || 
|-id=325 bgcolor=#d6d6d6
| 145325 ||  || — || June 9, 2005 || Kitt Peak || Spacewatch || — || align=right | 4.1 km || 
|-id=326 bgcolor=#E9E9E9
| 145326 ||  || — || June 10, 2005 || Kitt Peak || Spacewatch || MAR || align=right | 1.9 km || 
|-id=327 bgcolor=#fefefe
| 145327 ||  || — || June 12, 2005 || Mount Lemmon || Mount Lemmon Survey || — || align=right | 1.1 km || 
|-id=328 bgcolor=#E9E9E9
| 145328 ||  || — || June 13, 2005 || Mount Lemmon || Mount Lemmon Survey || MIS || align=right | 3.8 km || 
|-id=329 bgcolor=#E9E9E9
| 145329 ||  || — || June 11, 2005 || Kitt Peak || Spacewatch || — || align=right | 4.0 km || 
|-id=330 bgcolor=#E9E9E9
| 145330 ||  || — || June 11, 2005 || Kitt Peak || Spacewatch || — || align=right | 1.6 km || 
|-id=331 bgcolor=#fefefe
| 145331 ||  || — || June 11, 2005 || Kitt Peak || Spacewatch || — || align=right | 1.7 km || 
|-id=332 bgcolor=#E9E9E9
| 145332 ||  || — || June 13, 2005 || Kitt Peak || Spacewatch || — || align=right | 2.2 km || 
|-id=333 bgcolor=#E9E9E9
| 145333 ||  || — || June 10, 2005 || Kitt Peak || Spacewatch || WIT || align=right | 1.7 km || 
|-id=334 bgcolor=#E9E9E9
| 145334 ||  || — || June 11, 2005 || Kitt Peak || Spacewatch || — || align=right | 1.9 km || 
|-id=335 bgcolor=#E9E9E9
| 145335 ||  || — || June 13, 2005 || Kitt Peak || Spacewatch || — || align=right | 2.6 km || 
|-id=336 bgcolor=#E9E9E9
| 145336 ||  || — || June 2, 2005 || Catalina || CSS || BRU || align=right | 4.5 km || 
|-id=337 bgcolor=#d6d6d6
| 145337 ||  || — || June 17, 2005 || Mount Lemmon || Mount Lemmon Survey || KOR || align=right | 2.1 km || 
|-id=338 bgcolor=#E9E9E9
| 145338 ||  || — || June 17, 2005 || Mount Lemmon || Mount Lemmon Survey || — || align=right | 1.6 km || 
|-id=339 bgcolor=#d6d6d6
| 145339 ||  || — || June 21, 2005 || Palomar || NEAT || — || align=right | 6.6 km || 
|-id=340 bgcolor=#E9E9E9
| 145340 ||  || — || June 16, 2005 || Kitt Peak || Spacewatch || — || align=right | 3.2 km || 
|-id=341 bgcolor=#E9E9E9
| 145341 ||  || — || June 27, 2005 || Mount Lemmon || Mount Lemmon Survey || — || align=right | 2.5 km || 
|-id=342 bgcolor=#fefefe
| 145342 ||  || — || June 28, 2005 || Palomar || NEAT || V || align=right | 1.2 km || 
|-id=343 bgcolor=#d6d6d6
| 145343 ||  || — || June 23, 2005 || Palomar || NEAT || — || align=right | 5.4 km || 
|-id=344 bgcolor=#E9E9E9
| 145344 ||  || — || June 27, 2005 || Kitt Peak || Spacewatch || MAR || align=right | 2.0 km || 
|-id=345 bgcolor=#E9E9E9
| 145345 ||  || — || June 28, 2005 || Palomar || NEAT || — || align=right | 3.9 km || 
|-id=346 bgcolor=#E9E9E9
| 145346 ||  || — || June 29, 2005 || Kitt Peak || Spacewatch || — || align=right | 3.2 km || 
|-id=347 bgcolor=#E9E9E9
| 145347 ||  || — || June 29, 2005 || Palomar || NEAT || HEN || align=right | 1.9 km || 
|-id=348 bgcolor=#d6d6d6
| 145348 ||  || — || June 29, 2005 || Palomar || NEAT || 7:4 || align=right | 5.3 km || 
|-id=349 bgcolor=#E9E9E9
| 145349 ||  || — || June 27, 2005 || Junk Bond || D. Healy || — || align=right | 2.5 km || 
|-id=350 bgcolor=#fefefe
| 145350 ||  || — || June 28, 2005 || Palomar || NEAT || V || align=right | 1.3 km || 
|-id=351 bgcolor=#E9E9E9
| 145351 ||  || — || June 29, 2005 || Kitt Peak || Spacewatch || EUN || align=right | 1.9 km || 
|-id=352 bgcolor=#d6d6d6
| 145352 ||  || — || June 30, 2005 || Palomar || NEAT || — || align=right | 5.5 km || 
|-id=353 bgcolor=#E9E9E9
| 145353 ||  || — || June 30, 2005 || Kitt Peak || Spacewatch || — || align=right | 2.9 km || 
|-id=354 bgcolor=#d6d6d6
| 145354 ||  || — || June 30, 2005 || Kitt Peak || Spacewatch || THM || align=right | 4.2 km || 
|-id=355 bgcolor=#d6d6d6
| 145355 ||  || — || June 30, 2005 || Kitt Peak || Spacewatch || EOS || align=right | 3.5 km || 
|-id=356 bgcolor=#fefefe
| 145356 ||  || — || June 26, 2005 || Mount Lemmon || Mount Lemmon Survey || — || align=right | 1.4 km || 
|-id=357 bgcolor=#d6d6d6
| 145357 ||  || — || June 27, 2005 || Kitt Peak || Spacewatch || — || align=right | 4.1 km || 
|-id=358 bgcolor=#E9E9E9
| 145358 ||  || — || June 27, 2005 || Kitt Peak || Spacewatch || — || align=right | 2.1 km || 
|-id=359 bgcolor=#fefefe
| 145359 ||  || — || June 28, 2005 || Kitt Peak || Spacewatch || — || align=right | 1.2 km || 
|-id=360 bgcolor=#E9E9E9
| 145360 ||  || — || June 29, 2005 || Kitt Peak || Spacewatch || — || align=right | 3.1 km || 
|-id=361 bgcolor=#d6d6d6
| 145361 ||  || — || June 29, 2005 || Kitt Peak || Spacewatch || — || align=right | 5.4 km || 
|-id=362 bgcolor=#E9E9E9
| 145362 ||  || — || June 29, 2005 || Kitt Peak || Spacewatch || — || align=right | 1.4 km || 
|-id=363 bgcolor=#d6d6d6
| 145363 ||  || — || June 30, 2005 || Kitt Peak || Spacewatch || — || align=right | 4.7 km || 
|-id=364 bgcolor=#E9E9E9
| 145364 ||  || — || June 30, 2005 || Palomar || NEAT || MIT || align=right | 5.3 km || 
|-id=365 bgcolor=#d6d6d6
| 145365 ||  || — || June 30, 2005 || Kitt Peak || Spacewatch || CHA || align=right | 3.8 km || 
|-id=366 bgcolor=#d6d6d6
| 145366 ||  || — || June 29, 2005 || Palomar || NEAT || — || align=right | 4.6 km || 
|-id=367 bgcolor=#d6d6d6
| 145367 ||  || — || June 30, 2005 || Kitt Peak || Spacewatch || — || align=right | 3.7 km || 
|-id=368 bgcolor=#d6d6d6
| 145368 ||  || — || June 30, 2005 || Palomar || NEAT || 3:2 || align=right | 6.2 km || 
|-id=369 bgcolor=#E9E9E9
| 145369 ||  || — || June 24, 2005 || Palomar || NEAT || — || align=right | 3.5 km || 
|-id=370 bgcolor=#E9E9E9
| 145370 ||  || — || June 27, 2005 || Palomar || NEAT || — || align=right | 3.5 km || 
|-id=371 bgcolor=#E9E9E9
| 145371 ||  || — || June 27, 2005 || Kitt Peak || Spacewatch || — || align=right | 3.5 km || 
|-id=372 bgcolor=#E9E9E9
| 145372 ||  || — || June 27, 2005 || Palomar || NEAT || — || align=right | 2.6 km || 
|-id=373 bgcolor=#d6d6d6
| 145373 ||  || — || June 30, 2005 || Kitt Peak || Spacewatch || SHU3:2 || align=right | 7.7 km || 
|-id=374 bgcolor=#d6d6d6
| 145374 ||  || — || June 30, 2005 || Anderson Mesa || LONEOS || — || align=right | 4.8 km || 
|-id=375 bgcolor=#fefefe
| 145375 ||  || — || July 2, 2005 || Kitt Peak || Spacewatch || — || align=right | 1.9 km || 
|-id=376 bgcolor=#d6d6d6
| 145376 ||  || — || July 4, 2005 || Catalina || CSS || — || align=right | 7.9 km || 
|-id=377 bgcolor=#d6d6d6
| 145377 ||  || — || July 4, 2005 || Mount Lemmon || Mount Lemmon Survey || CHA || align=right | 3.0 km || 
|-id=378 bgcolor=#E9E9E9
| 145378 ||  || — || July 1, 2005 || Kitt Peak || Spacewatch || — || align=right | 1.5 km || 
|-id=379 bgcolor=#fefefe
| 145379 ||  || — || July 1, 2005 || Kitt Peak || Spacewatch || — || align=right data-sort-value="0.95" | 950 m || 
|-id=380 bgcolor=#d6d6d6
| 145380 ||  || — || July 3, 2005 || Mount Lemmon || Mount Lemmon Survey || — || align=right | 3.1 km || 
|-id=381 bgcolor=#E9E9E9
| 145381 ||  || — || July 4, 2005 || Mount Lemmon || Mount Lemmon Survey || — || align=right | 3.0 km || 
|-id=382 bgcolor=#d6d6d6
| 145382 ||  || — || July 4, 2005 || Palomar || NEAT || EOS || align=right | 3.6 km || 
|-id=383 bgcolor=#d6d6d6
| 145383 ||  || — || July 5, 2005 || Kitt Peak || Spacewatch || HYG || align=right | 4.3 km || 
|-id=384 bgcolor=#d6d6d6
| 145384 ||  || — || July 2, 2005 || Kitt Peak || Spacewatch || THM || align=right | 3.1 km || 
|-id=385 bgcolor=#E9E9E9
| 145385 ||  || — || July 2, 2005 || Kitt Peak || Spacewatch || — || align=right | 2.2 km || 
|-id=386 bgcolor=#d6d6d6
| 145386 ||  || — || July 2, 2005 || Kitt Peak || Spacewatch || — || align=right | 3.2 km || 
|-id=387 bgcolor=#fefefe
| 145387 ||  || — || July 4, 2005 || Mount Lemmon || Mount Lemmon Survey || — || align=right | 1.3 km || 
|-id=388 bgcolor=#fefefe
| 145388 ||  || — || July 4, 2005 || Mount Lemmon || Mount Lemmon Survey || — || align=right | 1.3 km || 
|-id=389 bgcolor=#fefefe
| 145389 ||  || — || July 4, 2005 || Mount Lemmon || Mount Lemmon Survey || — || align=right data-sort-value="0.99" | 990 m || 
|-id=390 bgcolor=#d6d6d6
| 145390 ||  || — || July 5, 2005 || Kitt Peak || Spacewatch || EOS || align=right | 3.6 km || 
|-id=391 bgcolor=#fefefe
| 145391 ||  || — || July 2, 2005 || Reedy Creek || J. Broughton || — || align=right | 1.8 km || 
|-id=392 bgcolor=#d6d6d6
| 145392 ||  || — || July 7, 2005 || Reedy Creek || J. Broughton || — || align=right | 5.1 km || 
|-id=393 bgcolor=#d6d6d6
| 145393 ||  || — || July 5, 2005 || Palomar || NEAT || — || align=right | 4.3 km || 
|-id=394 bgcolor=#fefefe
| 145394 ||  || — || July 6, 2005 || Kitt Peak || Spacewatch || NYS || align=right data-sort-value="0.94" | 940 m || 
|-id=395 bgcolor=#E9E9E9
| 145395 ||  || — || July 6, 2005 || Kitt Peak || Spacewatch || EUN || align=right | 1.8 km || 
|-id=396 bgcolor=#d6d6d6
| 145396 ||  || — || July 10, 2005 || Kitt Peak || Spacewatch || 3:2 || align=right | 6.7 km || 
|-id=397 bgcolor=#d6d6d6
| 145397 ||  || — || July 10, 2005 || Kitt Peak || Spacewatch || 3:2 || align=right | 5.9 km || 
|-id=398 bgcolor=#E9E9E9
| 145398 ||  || — || July 10, 2005 || Kitt Peak || Spacewatch || — || align=right | 2.8 km || 
|-id=399 bgcolor=#E9E9E9
| 145399 ||  || — || July 5, 2005 || Palomar || NEAT || — || align=right | 1.5 km || 
|-id=400 bgcolor=#E9E9E9
| 145400 ||  || — || July 1, 2005 || Kitt Peak || Spacewatch || — || align=right | 3.2 km || 
|}

145401–145500 

|-bgcolor=#d6d6d6
| 145401 ||  || — || July 4, 2005 || Palomar || NEAT || HYG || align=right | 5.6 km || 
|-id=402 bgcolor=#E9E9E9
| 145402 ||  || — || July 7, 2005 || Kitt Peak || Spacewatch || — || align=right | 4.1 km || 
|-id=403 bgcolor=#E9E9E9
| 145403 ||  || — || July 8, 2005 || Kitt Peak || Spacewatch || — || align=right | 2.3 km || 
|-id=404 bgcolor=#d6d6d6
| 145404 ||  || — || July 10, 2005 || Reedy Creek || J. Broughton || CRO || align=right | 5.2 km || 
|-id=405 bgcolor=#fefefe
| 145405 ||  || — || July 13, 2005 || Reedy Creek || J. Broughton || — || align=right | 1.7 km || 
|-id=406 bgcolor=#d6d6d6
| 145406 ||  || — || July 1, 2005 || Kitt Peak || Spacewatch || — || align=right | 4.8 km || 
|-id=407 bgcolor=#d6d6d6
| 145407 ||  || — || July 1, 2005 || Kitt Peak || Spacewatch || — || align=right | 4.9 km || 
|-id=408 bgcolor=#d6d6d6
| 145408 ||  || — || July 2, 2005 || Kitt Peak || Spacewatch || VER || align=right | 4.2 km || 
|-id=409 bgcolor=#d6d6d6
| 145409 ||  || — || July 3, 2005 || Palomar || NEAT || — || align=right | 5.6 km || 
|-id=410 bgcolor=#E9E9E9
| 145410 ||  || — || July 4, 2005 || Socorro || LINEAR || RAF || align=right | 2.3 km || 
|-id=411 bgcolor=#d6d6d6
| 145411 ||  || — || July 10, 2005 || Kitt Peak || Spacewatch || — || align=right | 5.3 km || 
|-id=412 bgcolor=#d6d6d6
| 145412 || 2005 OO || — || July 16, 2005 || Kitt Peak || Spacewatch || EOS || align=right | 3.3 km || 
|-id=413 bgcolor=#d6d6d6
| 145413 ||  || — || July 26, 2005 || Palomar || NEAT || EOS || align=right | 2.9 km || 
|-id=414 bgcolor=#E9E9E9
| 145414 ||  || — || July 29, 2005 || Palomar || NEAT || PAD || align=right | 2.6 km || 
|-id=415 bgcolor=#d6d6d6
| 145415 ||  || — || July 27, 2005 || Reedy Creek || J. Broughton || — || align=right | 5.7 km || 
|-id=416 bgcolor=#d6d6d6
| 145416 ||  || — || July 30, 2005 || Palomar || NEAT || — || align=right | 4.5 km || 
|-id=417 bgcolor=#d6d6d6
| 145417 ||  || — || August 2, 2005 || Socorro || LINEAR || HIL3:2 || align=right | 10 km || 
|-id=418 bgcolor=#d6d6d6
| 145418 ||  || — || August 4, 2005 || Palomar || NEAT || KOR || align=right | 2.5 km || 
|-id=419 bgcolor=#d6d6d6
| 145419 ||  || — || August 4, 2005 || Palomar || NEAT || — || align=right | 4.3 km || 
|-id=420 bgcolor=#d6d6d6
| 145420 ||  || — || August 6, 2005 || Siding Spring || SSS || — || align=right | 5.9 km || 
|-id=421 bgcolor=#d6d6d6
| 145421 ||  || — || August 2, 2005 || Socorro || LINEAR || SHU3:2 || align=right | 8.6 km || 
|-id=422 bgcolor=#d6d6d6
| 145422 ||  || — || August 7, 2005 || Haleakala || NEAT || 3:2 || align=right | 7.5 km || 
|-id=423 bgcolor=#d6d6d6
| 145423 ||  || — || August 24, 2005 || Palomar || NEAT || THM || align=right | 5.4 km || 
|-id=424 bgcolor=#d6d6d6
| 145424 ||  || — || August 25, 2005 || Palomar || NEAT || — || align=right | 3.5 km || 
|-id=425 bgcolor=#d6d6d6
| 145425 ||  || — || August 26, 2005 || Palomar || NEAT || NAEslow? || align=right | 5.0 km || 
|-id=426 bgcolor=#d6d6d6
| 145426 ||  || — || August 26, 2005 || Palomar || NEAT || 3:2 || align=right | 14 km || 
|-id=427 bgcolor=#d6d6d6
| 145427 ||  || — || August 27, 2005 || Anderson Mesa || LONEOS || — || align=right | 3.9 km || 
|-id=428 bgcolor=#d6d6d6
| 145428 ||  || — || August 26, 2005 || Palomar || NEAT || 7:4 || align=right | 5.1 km || 
|-id=429 bgcolor=#d6d6d6
| 145429 ||  || — || August 27, 2005 || Anderson Mesa || LONEOS || — || align=right | 6.3 km || 
|-id=430 bgcolor=#fefefe
| 145430 ||  || — || August 29, 2005 || Anderson Mesa || LONEOS || NYS || align=right | 1.5 km || 
|-id=431 bgcolor=#E9E9E9
| 145431 ||  || — || August 25, 2005 || Palomar || NEAT || HEN || align=right | 1.5 km || 
|-id=432 bgcolor=#fefefe
| 145432 ||  || — || August 25, 2005 || Palomar || NEAT || NYS || align=right | 2.0 km || 
|-id=433 bgcolor=#d6d6d6
| 145433 ||  || — || August 27, 2005 || Anderson Mesa || LONEOS || — || align=right | 6.3 km || 
|-id=434 bgcolor=#fefefe
| 145434 ||  || — || August 30, 2005 || Socorro || LINEAR || — || align=right | 1.7 km || 
|-id=435 bgcolor=#d6d6d6
| 145435 ||  || — || August 27, 2005 || Bergisch Gladbach || W. Bickel || — || align=right | 3.6 km || 
|-id=436 bgcolor=#d6d6d6
| 145436 ||  || — || August 25, 2005 || Palomar || NEAT || — || align=right | 3.9 km || 
|-id=437 bgcolor=#d6d6d6
| 145437 ||  || — || August 26, 2005 || Haleakala || NEAT || 3:2 || align=right | 8.7 km || 
|-id=438 bgcolor=#d6d6d6
| 145438 ||  || — || August 27, 2005 || Palomar || NEAT || THM || align=right | 4.1 km || 
|-id=439 bgcolor=#E9E9E9
| 145439 ||  || — || August 27, 2005 || Palomar || NEAT || — || align=right | 3.9 km || 
|-id=440 bgcolor=#d6d6d6
| 145440 ||  || — || August 26, 2005 || Campo Imperatore || CINEOS || — || align=right | 7.5 km || 
|-id=441 bgcolor=#d6d6d6
| 145441 ||  || — || August 26, 2005 || Palomar || NEAT || — || align=right | 4.8 km || 
|-id=442 bgcolor=#d6d6d6
| 145442 ||  || — || August 28, 2005 || Anderson Mesa || LONEOS || EOS || align=right | 3.6 km || 
|-id=443 bgcolor=#d6d6d6
| 145443 ||  || — || August 31, 2005 || Palomar || NEAT || 3:2 || align=right | 8.3 km || 
|-id=444 bgcolor=#E9E9E9
| 145444 ||  || — || August 31, 2005 || Kitt Peak || Spacewatch || — || align=right | 2.9 km || 
|-id=445 bgcolor=#d6d6d6
| 145445 Le Floch || 2005 RS ||  || September 2, 2005 || Saint-Véran || Saint-Véran Obs. || KOR || align=right | 2.3 km || 
|-id=446 bgcolor=#d6d6d6
| 145446 ||  || — || September 8, 2005 || Socorro || LINEAR || — || align=right | 5.9 km || 
|-id=447 bgcolor=#fefefe
| 145447 ||  || — || September 1, 2005 || Kitt Peak || Spacewatch || — || align=right | 1.2 km || 
|-id=448 bgcolor=#d6d6d6
| 145448 ||  || — || September 6, 2005 || Socorro || LINEAR || HYG || align=right | 5.9 km || 
|-id=449 bgcolor=#E9E9E9
| 145449 ||  || — || September 10, 2005 || Anderson Mesa || LONEOS || — || align=right | 3.4 km || 
|-id=450 bgcolor=#d6d6d6
| 145450 ||  || — || September 13, 2005 || Črni Vrh || Črni Vrh || LIX || align=right | 7.9 km || 
|-id=451 bgcolor=#C2E0FF
| 145451 ||  || — || September 9, 2005 || Apache Point || A. C. Becker, A. W. Puckett, J. Kubica || SDO || align=right | 530 km || 
|-id=452 bgcolor=#C2E0FF
| 145452 ||  || — || September 10, 2005 || Apache Point || A. C. Becker, A. W. Puckett, J. Kubica || other TNO || align=right | 799 km || 
|-id=453 bgcolor=#C2E0FF
| 145453 ||  || — || September 9, 2005 || Apache Point || A. C. Becker, A. W. Puckett, J. Kubica || Haumea || align=right | 646 km || 
|-id=454 bgcolor=#d6d6d6
| 145454 ||  || — || September 23, 2005 || Kitt Peak || Spacewatch || THM || align=right | 2.4 km || 
|-id=455 bgcolor=#E9E9E9
| 145455 ||  || — || September 23, 2005 || Kitt Peak || Spacewatch || — || align=right | 3.5 km || 
|-id=456 bgcolor=#d6d6d6
| 145456 ||  || — || September 24, 2005 || Vicques || M. Ory || ALA || align=right | 8.5 km || 
|-id=457 bgcolor=#d6d6d6
| 145457 ||  || — || September 23, 2005 || Anderson Mesa || LONEOS || THM || align=right | 3.7 km || 
|-id=458 bgcolor=#d6d6d6
| 145458 ||  || — || September 23, 2005 || Kitt Peak || Spacewatch || LIX || align=right | 9.2 km || 
|-id=459 bgcolor=#d6d6d6
| 145459 ||  || — || September 25, 2005 || Catalina || CSS || — || align=right | 4.2 km || 
|-id=460 bgcolor=#d6d6d6
| 145460 ||  || — || September 23, 2005 || Kitt Peak || Spacewatch || KOR || align=right | 2.1 km || 
|-id=461 bgcolor=#fefefe
| 145461 ||  || — || September 27, 2005 || Kitt Peak || Spacewatch || — || align=right | 1.1 km || 
|-id=462 bgcolor=#E9E9E9
| 145462 ||  || — || September 27, 2005 || Socorro || LINEAR || MAR || align=right | 1.8 km || 
|-id=463 bgcolor=#d6d6d6
| 145463 ||  || — || September 26, 2005 || Palomar || NEAT || EOS || align=right | 3.5 km || 
|-id=464 bgcolor=#E9E9E9
| 145464 ||  || — || September 27, 2005 || Socorro || LINEAR || HNS || align=right | 2.6 km || 
|-id=465 bgcolor=#d6d6d6
| 145465 ||  || — || September 25, 2005 || Kitt Peak || Spacewatch || — || align=right | 4.9 km || 
|-id=466 bgcolor=#fefefe
| 145466 ||  || — || September 28, 2005 || Palomar || NEAT || NYS || align=right data-sort-value="0.98" | 980 m || 
|-id=467 bgcolor=#fefefe
| 145467 ||  || — || September 28, 2005 || Palomar || NEAT || — || align=right | 1.6 km || 
|-id=468 bgcolor=#d6d6d6
| 145468 ||  || — || September 29, 2005 || Kitt Peak || Spacewatch || — || align=right | 4.3 km || 
|-id=469 bgcolor=#E9E9E9
| 145469 ||  || — || September 27, 2005 || Palomar || NEAT || MAR || align=right | 1.9 km || 
|-id=470 bgcolor=#E9E9E9
| 145470 ||  || — || September 27, 2005 || Palomar || NEAT || — || align=right | 3.8 km || 
|-id=471 bgcolor=#d6d6d6
| 145471 ||  || — || September 29, 2005 || Mount Lemmon || Mount Lemmon Survey || — || align=right | 4.4 km || 
|-id=472 bgcolor=#d6d6d6
| 145472 ||  || — || September 22, 2005 || Palomar || NEAT || — || align=right | 5.7 km || 
|-id=473 bgcolor=#d6d6d6
| 145473 ||  || — || September 23, 2005 || Palomar || NEAT || HIL3:2 || align=right | 7.3 km || 
|-id=474 bgcolor=#C2E0FF
| 145474 ||  || — || September 27, 2005 || Apache Point || A. C. Becker, A. W. Puckett, J. Kubica || SDOcritical || align=right | 246 km || 
|-id=475 bgcolor=#E9E9E9
| 145475 Rehoboth ||  ||  || October 12, 2005 || Calvin-Rehoboth || L. A. Molnar || — || align=right | 3.2 km || 
|-id=476 bgcolor=#d6d6d6
| 145476 ||  || — || October 2, 2005 || Palomar || NEAT || — || align=right | 5.4 km || 
|-id=477 bgcolor=#E9E9E9
| 145477 ||  || — || October 5, 2005 || Catalina || CSS || GEF || align=right | 2.5 km || 
|-id=478 bgcolor=#d6d6d6
| 145478 ||  || — || October 3, 2005 || Palomar || NEAT || 3:2 || align=right | 9.1 km || 
|-id=479 bgcolor=#d6d6d6
| 145479 ||  || — || October 7, 2005 || Kitt Peak || Spacewatch || KOR || align=right | 2.1 km || 
|-id=480 bgcolor=#C2E0FF
| 145480 ||  || — || October 11, 2005 || Apache Point || A. C. Becker, A. W. Puckett, J. Kubica || SDO || align=right | 550 km || 
|-id=481 bgcolor=#d6d6d6
| 145481 ||  || — || October 23, 2005 || Catalina || CSS || EOS || align=right | 6.4 km || 
|-id=482 bgcolor=#d6d6d6
| 145482 ||  || — || October 24, 2005 || Palomar || NEAT || — || align=right | 6.5 km || 
|-id=483 bgcolor=#d6d6d6
| 145483 ||  || — || October 25, 2005 || Catalina || CSS || — || align=right | 5.5 km || 
|-id=484 bgcolor=#d6d6d6
| 145484 ||  || — || October 23, 2005 || Palomar || NEAT || EOS || align=right | 4.0 km || 
|-id=485 bgcolor=#d6d6d6
| 145485 ||  || — || October 31, 2005 || Anderson Mesa || LONEOS || unusual || align=right | 8.0 km || 
|-id=486 bgcolor=#C7FF8F
| 145486 ||  || — || October 28, 2005 || Kitt Peak || Spacewatch || centaur || align=right | 21 km || 
|-id=487 bgcolor=#d6d6d6
| 145487 ||  || — || October 29, 2005 || Catalina || CSS || — || align=right | 5.8 km || 
|-id=488 bgcolor=#fefefe
| 145488 Kaczendre ||  ||  || November 4, 2005 || Piszkéstető || K. Sárneczky || V || align=right | 1.0 km || 
|-id=489 bgcolor=#E9E9E9
| 145489 ||  || — || November 4, 2005 || Catalina || CSS || HNS || align=right | 2.4 km || 
|-id=490 bgcolor=#d6d6d6
| 145490 ||  || — || November 1, 2005 || Anderson Mesa || LONEOS || — || align=right | 4.0 km || 
|-id=491 bgcolor=#d6d6d6
| 145491 ||  || — || November 6, 2005 || Mount Lemmon || Mount Lemmon Survey || — || align=right | 4.4 km || 
|-id=492 bgcolor=#d6d6d6
| 145492 ||  || — || November 21, 2005 || Anderson Mesa || LONEOS || 3:2 || align=right | 8.4 km || 
|-id=493 bgcolor=#d6d6d6
| 145493 ||  || — || November 21, 2005 || Catalina || CSS || 3:2 || align=right | 6.5 km || 
|-id=494 bgcolor=#E9E9E9
| 145494 ||  || — || November 22, 2005 || Kitt Peak || Spacewatch || — || align=right | 3.7 km || 
|-id=495 bgcolor=#fefefe
| 145495 ||  || — || November 22, 2005 || Kitt Peak || Spacewatch || NYS || align=right data-sort-value="0.96" | 960 m || 
|-id=496 bgcolor=#d6d6d6
| 145496 ||  || — || November 27, 2005 || Socorro || LINEAR || 7:4 || align=right | 9.8 km || 
|-id=497 bgcolor=#d6d6d6
| 145497 ||  || — || December 5, 2005 || Kitt Peak || Spacewatch || — || align=right | 4.8 km || 
|-id=498 bgcolor=#d6d6d6
| 145498 ||  || — || December 30, 2005 || Kitt Peak || Spacewatch || THM || align=right | 3.2 km || 
|-id=499 bgcolor=#d6d6d6
| 145499 ||  || — || January 21, 2006 || Kitt Peak || Spacewatch || HYG || align=right | 5.2 km || 
|-id=500 bgcolor=#E9E9E9
| 145500 ||  || — || January 24, 2006 || Socorro || LINEAR || — || align=right | 2.0 km || 
|}

145501–145600 

|-bgcolor=#d6d6d6
| 145501 ||  || — || January 23, 2006 || Catalina || CSS || — || align=right | 5.4 km || 
|-id=502 bgcolor=#d6d6d6
| 145502 ||  || — || January 28, 2006 || Kitt Peak || Spacewatch || — || align=right | 3.7 km || 
|-id=503 bgcolor=#d6d6d6
| 145503 ||  || — || January 24, 2006 || Anderson Mesa || LONEOS || — || align=right | 6.0 km || 
|-id=504 bgcolor=#fefefe
| 145504 ||  || — || January 31, 2006 || Kitt Peak || Spacewatch || NYS || align=right data-sort-value="0.97" | 970 m || 
|-id=505 bgcolor=#d6d6d6
| 145505 ||  || — || January 31, 2006 || Kitt Peak || Spacewatch || — || align=right | 3.2 km || 
|-id=506 bgcolor=#E9E9E9
| 145506 ||  || — || February 21, 2006 || Mount Lemmon || Mount Lemmon Survey || AEO || align=right | 3.6 km || 
|-id=507 bgcolor=#d6d6d6
| 145507 ||  || — || February 22, 2006 || Anderson Mesa || LONEOS || — || align=right | 5.9 km || 
|-id=508 bgcolor=#E9E9E9
| 145508 ||  || — || February 22, 2006 || Catalina || CSS || — || align=right | 2.6 km || 
|-id=509 bgcolor=#E9E9E9
| 145509 ||  || — || February 21, 2006 || Anderson Mesa || LONEOS || — || align=right | 4.4 km || 
|-id=510 bgcolor=#d6d6d6
| 145510 ||  || — || February 24, 2006 || Kitt Peak || Spacewatch || — || align=right | 5.1 km || 
|-id=511 bgcolor=#d6d6d6
| 145511 ||  || — || February 24, 2006 || Kitt Peak || Spacewatch || — || align=right | 3.9 km || 
|-id=512 bgcolor=#d6d6d6
| 145512 ||  || — || February 24, 2006 || Kitt Peak || Spacewatch || — || align=right | 3.9 km || 
|-id=513 bgcolor=#E9E9E9
| 145513 ||  || — || February 24, 2006 || Mount Lemmon || Mount Lemmon Survey || — || align=right | 3.6 km || 
|-id=514 bgcolor=#d6d6d6
| 145514 ||  || — || February 20, 2006 || Socorro || LINEAR || — || align=right | 5.7 km || 
|-id=515 bgcolor=#E9E9E9
| 145515 ||  || — || February 22, 2006 || Catalina || CSS || — || align=right | 3.9 km || 
|-id=516 bgcolor=#d6d6d6
| 145516 ||  || — || February 25, 2006 || Kitt Peak || Spacewatch || KAR || align=right | 2.2 km || 
|-id=517 bgcolor=#fefefe
| 145517 ||  || — || February 25, 2006 || Kitt Peak || Spacewatch || NYS || align=right data-sort-value="0.98" | 980 m || 
|-id=518 bgcolor=#fefefe
| 145518 ||  || — || February 23, 2006 || Anderson Mesa || LONEOS || — || align=right | 2.7 km || 
|-id=519 bgcolor=#d6d6d6
| 145519 ||  || — || February 25, 2006 || Kitt Peak || Spacewatch || — || align=right | 4.2 km || 
|-id=520 bgcolor=#E9E9E9
| 145520 ||  || — || March 2, 2006 || Kitt Peak || Spacewatch || — || align=right | 1.2 km || 
|-id=521 bgcolor=#d6d6d6
| 145521 ||  || — || March 3, 2006 || Socorro || LINEAR || — || align=right | 6.9 km || 
|-id=522 bgcolor=#d6d6d6
| 145522 ||  || — || March 4, 2006 || Catalina || CSS || EUP || align=right | 5.8 km || 
|-id=523 bgcolor=#E9E9E9
| 145523 Lulin ||  ||  || March 7, 2006 || Lulin Observatory || H.-C. Lin, Q.-z. Ye || — || align=right | 3.9 km || 
|-id=524 bgcolor=#E9E9E9
| 145524 || 2006 FS || — || March 22, 2006 || Catalina || CSS || — || align=right | 2.1 km || 
|-id=525 bgcolor=#fefefe
| 145525 ||  || — || March 23, 2006 || Kitt Peak || Spacewatch || NYS || align=right data-sort-value="0.83" | 830 m || 
|-id=526 bgcolor=#fefefe
| 145526 ||  || — || March 23, 2006 || Kitt Peak || Spacewatch || — || align=right | 1.5 km || 
|-id=527 bgcolor=#E9E9E9
| 145527 ||  || — || March 23, 2006 || Mount Lemmon || Mount Lemmon Survey || ADE || align=right | 3.5 km || 
|-id=528 bgcolor=#d6d6d6
| 145528 ||  || — || March 24, 2006 || Catalina || CSS || 7:4 || align=right | 6.7 km || 
|-id=529 bgcolor=#d6d6d6
| 145529 ||  || — || March 25, 2006 || Kitt Peak || Spacewatch || — || align=right | 5.3 km || 
|-id=530 bgcolor=#E9E9E9
| 145530 ||  || — || March 25, 2006 || Kitt Peak || Spacewatch || — || align=right | 2.1 km || 
|-id=531 bgcolor=#E9E9E9
| 145531 ||  || — || March 25, 2006 || Mount Lemmon || Mount Lemmon Survey || — || align=right | 1.1 km || 
|-id=532 bgcolor=#fefefe
| 145532 ||  || — || March 26, 2006 || Mount Lemmon || Mount Lemmon Survey || — || align=right | 1.8 km || 
|-id=533 bgcolor=#E9E9E9
| 145533 ||  || — || March 24, 2006 || Catalina || CSS || POS || align=right | 4.6 km || 
|-id=534 bgcolor=#E9E9E9
| 145534 Jhongda || 2006 GJ ||  || April 1, 2006 || Lulin Observatory || T.-C. Yang, Q.-z. Ye || MRX || align=right | 2.1 km || 
|-id=535 bgcolor=#d6d6d6
| 145535 ||  || — || April 8, 2006 || Great Shefford || P. Birtwhistle || — || align=right | 5.2 km || 
|-id=536 bgcolor=#fefefe
| 145536 ||  || — || April 2, 2006 || Kitt Peak || Spacewatch || — || align=right | 1.3 km || 
|-id=537 bgcolor=#d6d6d6
| 145537 ||  || — || April 2, 2006 || Kitt Peak || Spacewatch || KOR || align=right | 1.7 km || 
|-id=538 bgcolor=#E9E9E9
| 145538 ||  || — || April 2, 2006 || Kitt Peak || Spacewatch || — || align=right | 1.8 km || 
|-id=539 bgcolor=#E9E9E9
| 145539 ||  || — || April 7, 2006 || Catalina || CSS || — || align=right | 3.2 km || 
|-id=540 bgcolor=#fefefe
| 145540 ||  || — || April 9, 2006 || Kitt Peak || Spacewatch || — || align=right | 1.6 km || 
|-id=541 bgcolor=#d6d6d6
| 145541 ||  || — || April 20, 2006 || Kitt Peak || Spacewatch || KOR || align=right | 1.8 km || 
|-id=542 bgcolor=#fefefe
| 145542 ||  || — || April 26, 2006 || Kitt Peak || Spacewatch || MAS || align=right | 1.1 km || 
|-id=543 bgcolor=#d6d6d6
| 145543 ||  || — || May 6, 2006 || Kitt Peak || Spacewatch || — || align=right | 4.6 km || 
|-id=544 bgcolor=#E9E9E9
| 145544 ||  || — || May 7, 2006 || Kitt Peak || Spacewatch || JUN || align=right | 1.6 km || 
|-id=545 bgcolor=#d6d6d6
| 145545 Wensayling ||  ||  || May 22, 2006 || Lulin Observatory || Q.-z. Ye, T.-C. Yang || 7:4 || align=right | 5.8 km || 
|-id=546 bgcolor=#d6d6d6
| 145546 Suiqizhong ||  ||  || May 25, 2006 || Lulin Observatory || Q.-z. Ye, H.-C. Lin || THM || align=right | 3.6 km || 
|-id=547 bgcolor=#E9E9E9
| 145547 ||  || — || May 27, 2006 || Siding Spring || SSS || Tj (2.94) || align=right | 2.7 km || 
|-id=548 bgcolor=#fefefe
| 145548 ||  || — || May 26, 2006 || Mount Lemmon || Mount Lemmon Survey || — || align=right | 1.3 km || 
|-id=549 bgcolor=#E9E9E9
| 145549 ||  || — || May 23, 2006 || Siding Spring || SSS || — || align=right | 2.5 km || 
|-id=550 bgcolor=#E9E9E9
| 145550 ||  || — || May 29, 2006 || Siding Spring || SSS || — || align=right | 5.3 km || 
|-id=551 bgcolor=#E9E9E9
| 145551 ||  || — || June 10, 2006 || Palomar || NEAT || GEF || align=right | 2.5 km || 
|-id=552 bgcolor=#fefefe
| 145552 ||  || — || June 11, 2006 || Palomar || NEAT || — || align=right | 2.2 km || 
|-id=553 bgcolor=#fefefe
| 145553 ||  || — || June 3, 2006 || Catalina || CSS || slow || align=right | 1.4 km || 
|-id=554 bgcolor=#fefefe
| 145554 ||  || — || June 19, 2006 || Mount Lemmon || Mount Lemmon Survey || — || align=right | 1.5 km || 
|-id=555 bgcolor=#d6d6d6
| 145555 ||  || — || June 19, 2006 || Catalina || CSS || — || align=right | 6.6 km || 
|-id=556 bgcolor=#E9E9E9
| 145556 ||  || — || June 17, 2006 || Siding Spring || SSS || MAR || align=right | 2.0 km || 
|-id=557 bgcolor=#fefefe
| 145557 ||  || — || June 22, 2006 || Anderson Mesa || LONEOS || — || align=right | 1.4 km || 
|-id=558 bgcolor=#E9E9E9
| 145558 Raiatea || 2006 OR ||  || July 17, 2006 || Hibiscus || S. F. Hönig || XIZ || align=right | 2.4 km || 
|-id=559 bgcolor=#d6d6d6
| 145559 Didiermüller ||  ||  || July 18, 2006 || Vicques || M. Ory || EOS || align=right | 3.4 km || 
|-id=560 bgcolor=#E9E9E9
| 145560 ||  || — || July 18, 2006 || Socorro || LINEAR || — || align=right | 1.8 km || 
|-id=561 bgcolor=#E9E9E9
| 145561 ||  || — || July 18, 2006 || Siding Spring || SSS || GEF || align=right | 2.1 km || 
|-id=562 bgcolor=#E9E9E9
| 145562 Zurbriggen ||  ||  || July 24, 2006 || Marly || P. Kocher || MRX || align=right | 1.8 km || 
|-id=563 bgcolor=#fefefe
| 145563 ||  || — || July 18, 2006 || Mount Lemmon || Mount Lemmon Survey || — || align=right | 1.3 km || 
|-id=564 bgcolor=#E9E9E9
| 145564 ||  || — || July 20, 2006 || Palomar || NEAT || — || align=right | 1.9 km || 
|-id=565 bgcolor=#d6d6d6
| 145565 ||  || — || July 24, 2006 || Vicques || M. Ory || — || align=right | 5.2 km || 
|-id=566 bgcolor=#E9E9E9
| 145566 Andreasphilipp ||  ||  || July 25, 2006 || Ottmarsheim || C. Rinner || ADE || align=right | 5.3 km || 
|-id=567 bgcolor=#fefefe
| 145567 ||  || — || July 19, 2006 || Palomar || NEAT || — || align=right | 1.2 km || 
|-id=568 bgcolor=#d6d6d6
| 145568 ||  || — || July 20, 2006 || Palomar || NEAT || TIR || align=right | 4.8 km || 
|-id=569 bgcolor=#fefefe
| 145569 ||  || — || July 20, 2006 || Palomar || NEAT || — || align=right | 1.1 km || 
|-id=570 bgcolor=#fefefe
| 145570 ||  || — || July 20, 2006 || Palomar || NEAT || NYS || align=right | 1.3 km || 
|-id=571 bgcolor=#d6d6d6
| 145571 ||  || — || July 21, 2006 || Catalina || CSS || — || align=right | 6.5 km || 
|-id=572 bgcolor=#E9E9E9
| 145572 ||  || — || July 21, 2006 || Palomar || NEAT || — || align=right | 2.0 km || 
|-id=573 bgcolor=#fefefe
| 145573 ||  || — || July 20, 2006 || Siding Spring || SSS || — || align=right | 1.2 km || 
|-id=574 bgcolor=#E9E9E9
| 145574 ||  || — || July 21, 2006 || Socorro || LINEAR || — || align=right | 4.3 km || 
|-id=575 bgcolor=#E9E9E9
| 145575 ||  || — || July 20, 2006 || Palomar || NEAT || EUN || align=right | 3.9 km || 
|-id=576 bgcolor=#d6d6d6
| 145576 || 2006 PE || — || August 3, 2006 || Cordell-Lorenz || Cordell–Lorenz Obs. || — || align=right | 6.3 km || 
|-id=577 bgcolor=#fefefe
| 145577 ||  || — || August 8, 2006 || Siding Spring || SSS || NYS || align=right | 1.4 km || 
|-id=578 bgcolor=#E9E9E9
| 145578 ||  || — || August 15, 2006 || Reedy Creek || J. Broughton || EUN || align=right | 2.0 km || 
|-id=579 bgcolor=#E9E9E9
| 145579 ||  || — || August 12, 2006 || Palomar || NEAT || DOR || align=right | 4.3 km || 
|-id=580 bgcolor=#d6d6d6
| 145580 ||  || — || August 13, 2006 || Palomar || NEAT || — || align=right | 7.0 km || 
|-id=581 bgcolor=#E9E9E9
| 145581 ||  || — || August 13, 2006 || Palomar || NEAT || AST || align=right | 2.5 km || 
|-id=582 bgcolor=#E9E9E9
| 145582 ||  || — || August 13, 2006 || Palomar || NEAT || — || align=right | 3.6 km || 
|-id=583 bgcolor=#E9E9E9
| 145583 ||  || — || August 14, 2006 || Siding Spring || SSS || — || align=right | 2.3 km || 
|-id=584 bgcolor=#fefefe
| 145584 ||  || — || August 15, 2006 || Palomar || NEAT || NYS || align=right | 1.5 km || 
|-id=585 bgcolor=#fefefe
| 145585 ||  || — || August 15, 2006 || Palomar || NEAT || NYS || align=right | 1.0 km || 
|-id=586 bgcolor=#fefefe
| 145586 ||  || — || August 15, 2006 || Palomar || NEAT || — || align=right | 1.7 km || 
|-id=587 bgcolor=#fefefe
| 145587 ||  || — || August 15, 2006 || Palomar || NEAT || — || align=right | 1.2 km || 
|-id=588 bgcolor=#fefefe
| 145588 Sudongpo ||  ||  || August 15, 2006 || Lulin Observatory || Q.-z. Ye || V || align=right data-sort-value="0.87" | 870 m || 
|-id=589 bgcolor=#fefefe
| 145589 ||  || — || August 15, 2006 || Palomar || NEAT || V || align=right data-sort-value="0.94" | 940 m || 
|-id=590 bgcolor=#d6d6d6
| 145590 ||  || — || August 13, 2006 || Palomar || NEAT || KOR || align=right | 2.2 km || 
|-id=591 bgcolor=#d6d6d6
| 145591 ||  || — || August 13, 2006 || Palomar || NEAT || — || align=right | 5.0 km || 
|-id=592 bgcolor=#d6d6d6
| 145592 ||  || — || August 13, 2006 || Palomar || NEAT || — || align=right | 5.3 km || 
|-id=593 bgcolor=#d6d6d6
| 145593 Xántus ||  ||  || August 18, 2006 || Piszkéstető || K. Sárneczky || — || align=right | 3.4 km || 
|-id=594 bgcolor=#fefefe
| 145594 ||  || — || August 17, 2006 || Palomar || NEAT || NYS || align=right | 1.2 km || 
|-id=595 bgcolor=#fefefe
| 145595 ||  || — || August 17, 2006 || Palomar || NEAT || — || align=right | 1.9 km || 
|-id=596 bgcolor=#E9E9E9
| 145596 ||  || — || August 18, 2006 || Socorro || LINEAR || — || align=right | 3.4 km || 
|-id=597 bgcolor=#fefefe
| 145597 ||  || — || August 17, 2006 || Palomar || NEAT || V || align=right | 1.2 km || 
|-id=598 bgcolor=#fefefe
| 145598 ||  || — || August 17, 2006 || Palomar || NEAT || FLO || align=right data-sort-value="0.89" | 890 m || 
|-id=599 bgcolor=#fefefe
| 145599 ||  || — || August 19, 2006 || Kitt Peak || Spacewatch || MAS || align=right | 1.2 km || 
|-id=600 bgcolor=#d6d6d6
| 145600 ||  || — || August 16, 2006 || Siding Spring || SSS || — || align=right | 7.5 km || 
|}

145601–145700 

|-bgcolor=#fefefe
| 145601 ||  || — || August 18, 2006 || Socorro || LINEAR || — || align=right | 1.7 km || 
|-id=602 bgcolor=#fefefe
| 145602 ||  || — || August 18, 2006 || Anderson Mesa || LONEOS || — || align=right | 1.0 km || 
|-id=603 bgcolor=#fefefe
| 145603 ||  || — || August 17, 2006 || Palomar || NEAT || — || align=right | 1.0 km || 
|-id=604 bgcolor=#fefefe
| 145604 ||  || — || August 18, 2006 || Socorro || LINEAR || — || align=right | 1.7 km || 
|-id=605 bgcolor=#fefefe
| 145605 ||  || — || August 19, 2006 || Kitt Peak || Spacewatch || NYS || align=right | 1.0 km || 
|-id=606 bgcolor=#E9E9E9
| 145606 ||  || — || August 22, 2006 || Siding Spring || SSS || MAR || align=right | 2.0 km || 
|-id=607 bgcolor=#fefefe
| 145607 ||  || — || August 20, 2006 || Palomar || NEAT || — || align=right | 1.3 km || 
|-id=608 bgcolor=#d6d6d6
| 145608 ||  || — || August 17, 2006 || Palomar || NEAT || EOS || align=right | 3.1 km || 
|-id=609 bgcolor=#fefefe
| 145609 ||  || — || August 17, 2006 || Palomar || NEAT || MAS || align=right | 1.4 km || 
|-id=610 bgcolor=#E9E9E9
| 145610 ||  || — || August 16, 2006 || Siding Spring || SSS || — || align=right | 2.6 km || 
|-id=611 bgcolor=#E9E9E9
| 145611 ||  || — || August 17, 2006 || Palomar || NEAT || AGN || align=right | 1.7 km || 
|-id=612 bgcolor=#fefefe
| 145612 ||  || — || August 19, 2006 || Palomar || NEAT || V || align=right data-sort-value="0.89" | 890 m || 
|-id=613 bgcolor=#E9E9E9
| 145613 ||  || — || August 20, 2006 || Kitt Peak || Spacewatch || — || align=right | 1.9 km || 
|-id=614 bgcolor=#fefefe
| 145614 ||  || — || August 21, 2006 || Kitt Peak || Spacewatch || MAS || align=right | 1.1 km || 
|-id=615 bgcolor=#d6d6d6
| 145615 ||  || — || August 17, 2006 || Palomar || NEAT || — || align=right | 3.8 km || 
|-id=616 bgcolor=#d6d6d6
| 145616 ||  || — || August 18, 2006 || Anderson Mesa || LONEOS || — || align=right | 9.5 km || 
|-id=617 bgcolor=#E9E9E9
| 145617 ||  || — || August 20, 2006 || Palomar || NEAT || MAR || align=right | 1.5 km || 
|-id=618 bgcolor=#E9E9E9
| 145618 ||  || — || August 23, 2006 || Socorro || LINEAR || — || align=right | 4.1 km || 
|-id=619 bgcolor=#E9E9E9
| 145619 ||  || — || August 24, 2006 || Socorro || LINEAR || ADE || align=right | 3.8 km || 
|-id=620 bgcolor=#d6d6d6
| 145620 ||  || — || August 16, 2006 || Palomar || NEAT || — || align=right | 3.4 km || 
|-id=621 bgcolor=#d6d6d6
| 145621 ||  || — || August 16, 2006 || Palomar || NEAT || — || align=right | 5.0 km || 
|-id=622 bgcolor=#E9E9E9
| 145622 ||  || — || August 16, 2006 || Palomar || NEAT || — || align=right | 3.4 km || 
|-id=623 bgcolor=#fefefe
| 145623 ||  || — || August 24, 2006 || Palomar || NEAT || — || align=right | 1.3 km || 
|-id=624 bgcolor=#E9E9E9
| 145624 ||  || — || August 27, 2006 || Kitt Peak || Spacewatch || — || align=right | 2.9 km || 
|-id=625 bgcolor=#fefefe
| 145625 ||  || — || August 28, 2006 || Socorro || LINEAR || FLO || align=right | 1.1 km || 
|-id=626 bgcolor=#fefefe
| 145626 ||  || — || August 28, 2006 || Anderson Mesa || LONEOS || FLO || align=right | 1.2 km || 
|-id=627 bgcolor=#C7FF8F
| 145627 ||  || — || September 14, 2006 || Palomar || NEAT || unusual || align=right | 27 km || 
|-id=628 bgcolor=#fefefe
| 145628 || 2135 P-L || — || September 24, 1960 || Palomar || PLS || — || align=right data-sort-value="0.89" | 890 m || 
|-id=629 bgcolor=#fefefe
| 145629 || 2188 P-L || — || September 24, 1960 || Palomar || PLS || NYS || align=right | 1.1 km || 
|-id=630 bgcolor=#E9E9E9
| 145630 || 2214 P-L || — || September 24, 1960 || Palomar || PLS || — || align=right | 1.8 km || 
|-id=631 bgcolor=#d6d6d6
| 145631 || 2215 P-L || — || September 24, 1960 || Palomar || PLS || HYG || align=right | 4.7 km || 
|-id=632 bgcolor=#d6d6d6
| 145632 || 2216 P-L || — || September 24, 1960 || Palomar || PLS || — || align=right | 3.2 km || 
|-id=633 bgcolor=#fefefe
| 145633 || 2227 P-L || — || September 24, 1960 || Palomar || PLS || — || align=right | 1.2 km || 
|-id=634 bgcolor=#E9E9E9
| 145634 || 2516 P-L || — || September 24, 1960 || Palomar || PLS || GEF || align=right | 2.5 km || 
|-id=635 bgcolor=#E9E9E9
| 145635 || 2585 P-L || — || September 24, 1960 || Palomar || PLS || — || align=right | 4.6 km || 
|-id=636 bgcolor=#fefefe
| 145636 || 2597 P-L || — || September 24, 1960 || Palomar || PLS || — || align=right | 1.3 km || 
|-id=637 bgcolor=#E9E9E9
| 145637 || 2671 P-L || — || September 24, 1960 || Palomar || PLS || — || align=right | 4.2 km || 
|-id=638 bgcolor=#E9E9E9
| 145638 || 2715 P-L || — || September 24, 1960 || Palomar || PLS || — || align=right | 1.7 km || 
|-id=639 bgcolor=#E9E9E9
| 145639 || 2847 P-L || — || September 24, 1960 || Palomar || PLS || — || align=right | 1.8 km || 
|-id=640 bgcolor=#E9E9E9
| 145640 || 3008 P-L || — || September 24, 1960 || Palomar || PLS || — || align=right | 2.1 km || 
|-id=641 bgcolor=#fefefe
| 145641 || 3562 P-L || — || October 17, 1960 || Palomar || PLS || — || align=right | 2.5 km || 
|-id=642 bgcolor=#E9E9E9
| 145642 || 4058 P-L || — || September 24, 1960 || Palomar || PLS || NEM || align=right | 4.8 km || 
|-id=643 bgcolor=#d6d6d6
| 145643 || 4064 P-L || — || September 24, 1960 || Palomar || PLS || — || align=right | 4.4 km || 
|-id=644 bgcolor=#d6d6d6
| 145644 || 4107 P-L || — || September 24, 1960 || Palomar || PLS || HYG || align=right | 7.0 km || 
|-id=645 bgcolor=#d6d6d6
| 145645 || 4125 P-L || — || September 24, 1960 || Palomar || PLS || — || align=right | 6.6 km || 
|-id=646 bgcolor=#fefefe
| 145646 || 4170 P-L || — || September 24, 1960 || Palomar || PLS || — || align=right | 1.6 km || 
|-id=647 bgcolor=#E9E9E9
| 145647 || 4193 P-L || — || September 24, 1960 || Palomar || PLS || — || align=right | 2.0 km || 
|-id=648 bgcolor=#fefefe
| 145648 || 4223 P-L || — || September 24, 1960 || Palomar || PLS || NYS || align=right | 1.2 km || 
|-id=649 bgcolor=#E9E9E9
| 145649 || 4233 P-L || — || September 24, 1960 || Palomar || PLS || XIZ || align=right | 2.2 km || 
|-id=650 bgcolor=#E9E9E9
| 145650 || 4242 P-L || — || September 24, 1960 || Palomar || PLS || — || align=right | 1.1 km || 
|-id=651 bgcolor=#fefefe
| 145651 || 4264 P-L || — || September 24, 1960 || Palomar || PLS || MAS || align=right data-sort-value="0.94" | 940 m || 
|-id=652 bgcolor=#d6d6d6
| 145652 || 4278 P-L || — || September 24, 1960 || Palomar || PLS || HYG || align=right | 6.0 km || 
|-id=653 bgcolor=#E9E9E9
| 145653 || 4333 P-L || — || September 24, 1960 || Palomar || PLS || EUN || align=right | 1.7 km || 
|-id=654 bgcolor=#d6d6d6
| 145654 || 4728 P-L || — || September 24, 1960 || Palomar || PLS || — || align=right | 4.3 km || 
|-id=655 bgcolor=#d6d6d6
| 145655 || 4740 P-L || — || September 24, 1960 || Palomar || PLS || — || align=right | 5.1 km || 
|-id=656 bgcolor=#FFC2E0
| 145656 || 4788 P-L || — || September 24, 1960 || Palomar || PLS || AMO +1km || align=right | 1.8 km || 
|-id=657 bgcolor=#d6d6d6
| 145657 || 6218 P-L || — || September 24, 1960 || Palomar || PLS || — || align=right | 6.8 km || 
|-id=658 bgcolor=#E9E9E9
| 145658 || 6596 P-L || — || September 24, 1960 || Palomar || PLS || — || align=right | 2.4 km || 
|-id=659 bgcolor=#E9E9E9
| 145659 || 6697 P-L || — || September 24, 1960 || Palomar || PLS || XIZ || align=right | 4.0 km || 
|-id=660 bgcolor=#E9E9E9
| 145660 || 6701 P-L || — || September 24, 1960 || Palomar || PLS || — || align=right | 2.9 km || 
|-id=661 bgcolor=#d6d6d6
| 145661 || 6714 P-L || — || September 24, 1960 || Palomar || PLS || ALA || align=right | 7.4 km || 
|-id=662 bgcolor=#E9E9E9
| 145662 || 6737 P-L || — || September 24, 1960 || Palomar || PLS || — || align=right | 2.4 km || 
|-id=663 bgcolor=#E9E9E9
| 145663 || 6805 P-L || — || September 24, 1960 || Palomar || PLS || — || align=right | 1.4 km || 
|-id=664 bgcolor=#fefefe
| 145664 || 6848 P-L || — || September 24, 1960 || Palomar || PLS || FLO || align=right data-sort-value="0.74" | 740 m || 
|-id=665 bgcolor=#d6d6d6
| 145665 || 6859 P-L || — || September 24, 1960 || Palomar || PLS || — || align=right | 4.6 km || 
|-id=666 bgcolor=#E9E9E9
| 145666 || 6882 P-L || — || September 24, 1960 || Palomar || PLS || — || align=right | 1.2 km || 
|-id=667 bgcolor=#E9E9E9
| 145667 || 9537 P-L || — || October 17, 1960 || Palomar || PLS || — || align=right | 2.7 km || 
|-id=668 bgcolor=#fefefe
| 145668 || 1071 T-1 || — || March 25, 1971 || Palomar || PLS || NYS || align=right | 1.2 km || 
|-id=669 bgcolor=#E9E9E9
| 145669 || 2244 T-1 || — || March 25, 1971 || Palomar || PLS || — || align=right | 1.9 km || 
|-id=670 bgcolor=#E9E9E9
| 145670 || 4241 T-1 || — || March 26, 1971 || Palomar || PLS || EUN || align=right | 2.4 km || 
|-id=671 bgcolor=#fefefe
| 145671 || 1073 T-2 || — || September 29, 1973 || Palomar || PLS || — || align=right | 1.8 km || 
|-id=672 bgcolor=#E9E9E9
| 145672 || 1321 T-2 || — || September 29, 1973 || Palomar || PLS || — || align=right | 2.1 km || 
|-id=673 bgcolor=#d6d6d6
| 145673 || 1333 T-2 || — || September 29, 1973 || Palomar || PLS || — || align=right | 4.3 km || 
|-id=674 bgcolor=#fefefe
| 145674 || 1524 T-2 || — || September 29, 1973 || Palomar || PLS || MAS || align=right data-sort-value="0.83" | 830 m || 
|-id=675 bgcolor=#fefefe
| 145675 || 2002 T-2 || — || September 29, 1973 || Palomar || PLS || — || align=right | 1.5 km || 
|-id=676 bgcolor=#fefefe
| 145676 || 2093 T-2 || — || September 29, 1973 || Palomar || PLS || — || align=right | 1.0 km || 
|-id=677 bgcolor=#E9E9E9
| 145677 || 2172 T-2 || — || September 29, 1973 || Palomar || PLS || EUN || align=right | 1.9 km || 
|-id=678 bgcolor=#d6d6d6
| 145678 || 2251 T-2 || — || September 29, 1973 || Palomar || PLS || — || align=right | 8.5 km || 
|-id=679 bgcolor=#E9E9E9
| 145679 || 2402 T-2 || — || September 24, 1973 || Palomar || PLS || — || align=right | 1.8 km || 
|-id=680 bgcolor=#E9E9E9
| 145680 || 3002 T-2 || — || September 30, 1973 || Palomar || PLS || DOR || align=right | 4.8 km || 
|-id=681 bgcolor=#fefefe
| 145681 || 3018 T-2 || — || September 30, 1973 || Palomar || PLS || V || align=right | 1.0 km || 
|-id=682 bgcolor=#E9E9E9
| 145682 || 3131 T-2 || — || September 30, 1973 || Palomar || PLS || EUN || align=right | 2.9 km || 
|-id=683 bgcolor=#fefefe
| 145683 || 3275 T-2 || — || September 30, 1973 || Palomar || PLS || EUT || align=right data-sort-value="0.88" | 880 m || 
|-id=684 bgcolor=#d6d6d6
| 145684 || 3279 T-2 || — || September 30, 1973 || Palomar || PLS || — || align=right | 5.4 km || 
|-id=685 bgcolor=#E9E9E9
| 145685 || 4075 T-2 || — || September 29, 1973 || Palomar || PLS || KON || align=right | 2.3 km || 
|-id=686 bgcolor=#E9E9E9
| 145686 || 4077 T-2 || — || September 29, 1973 || Palomar || PLS || KON || align=right | 3.1 km || 
|-id=687 bgcolor=#d6d6d6
| 145687 || 1072 T-3 || — || October 16, 1977 || Palomar || PLS || — || align=right | 4.4 km || 
|-id=688 bgcolor=#fefefe
| 145688 || 2159 T-3 || — || October 16, 1977 || Palomar || PLS || — || align=right data-sort-value="0.96" | 960 m || 
|-id=689 bgcolor=#E9E9E9
| 145689 || 2219 T-3 || — || October 16, 1977 || Palomar || PLS || — || align=right | 2.8 km || 
|-id=690 bgcolor=#fefefe
| 145690 || 2280 T-3 || — || October 16, 1977 || Palomar || PLS || — || align=right | 1.2 km || 
|-id=691 bgcolor=#d6d6d6
| 145691 || 2319 T-3 || — || October 16, 1977 || Palomar || PLS || BRA || align=right | 2.2 km || 
|-id=692 bgcolor=#d6d6d6
| 145692 || 2625 T-3 || — || October 16, 1977 || Palomar || PLS || EOS || align=right | 3.3 km || 
|-id=693 bgcolor=#fefefe
| 145693 || 3112 T-3 || — || October 16, 1977 || Palomar || PLS || NYS || align=right | 1.0 km || 
|-id=694 bgcolor=#fefefe
| 145694 || 3198 T-3 || — || October 16, 1977 || Palomar || PLS || — || align=right | 1.4 km || 
|-id=695 bgcolor=#E9E9E9
| 145695 || 3290 T-3 || — || October 16, 1977 || Palomar || PLS || GAL || align=right | 2.5 km || 
|-id=696 bgcolor=#d6d6d6
| 145696 || 3361 T-3 || — || October 16, 1977 || Palomar || PLS || HYG || align=right | 4.9 km || 
|-id=697 bgcolor=#fefefe
| 145697 || 3394 T-3 || — || October 16, 1977 || Palomar || PLS || MAS || align=right | 1.3 km || 
|-id=698 bgcolor=#E9E9E9
| 145698 || 3471 T-3 || — || October 16, 1977 || Palomar || PLS || — || align=right | 2.3 km || 
|-id=699 bgcolor=#E9E9E9
| 145699 || 3499 T-3 || — || October 16, 1977 || Palomar || PLS || — || align=right | 1.5 km || 
|-id=700 bgcolor=#E9E9E9
| 145700 || 4139 T-3 || — || October 16, 1977 || Palomar || PLS || — || align=right | 1.9 km || 
|}

145701–145800 

|-bgcolor=#E9E9E9
| 145701 || 4269 T-3 || — || October 16, 1977 || Palomar || PLS || — || align=right | 1.9 km || 
|-id=702 bgcolor=#fefefe
| 145702 || 4274 T-3 || — || October 16, 1977 || Palomar || PLS || NYS || align=right | 1.1 km || 
|-id=703 bgcolor=#E9E9E9
| 145703 || 4389 T-3 || — || October 16, 1977 || Palomar || PLS || BRU || align=right | 5.8 km || 
|-id=704 bgcolor=#E9E9E9
| 145704 || 4537 T-3 || — || October 16, 1977 || Palomar || PLS || — || align=right | 1.8 km || 
|-id=705 bgcolor=#fefefe
| 145705 || 5149 T-3 || — || October 16, 1977 || Palomar || PLS || — || align=right | 1.2 km || 
|-id=706 bgcolor=#E9E9E9
| 145706 ||  || — || March 7, 1981 || Siding Spring || S. J. Bus || — || align=right | 4.0 km || 
|-id=707 bgcolor=#E9E9E9
| 145707 ||  || — || March 1, 1981 || Siding Spring || S. J. Bus || — || align=right | 6.9 km || 
|-id=708 bgcolor=#d6d6d6
| 145708 ||  || — || March 6, 1981 || Siding Spring || S. J. Bus || EOS || align=right | 4.1 km || 
|-id=709 bgcolor=#E9E9E9
| 145709 Rocknowar ||  ||  || September 28, 1981 || Siding Spring || E. Colombini || — || align=right | 2.3 km || 
|-id=710 bgcolor=#E9E9E9
| 145710 ||  || — || September 26, 1989 || La Silla || E. W. Elst || — || align=right | 1.7 km || 
|-id=711 bgcolor=#fefefe
| 145711 ||  || — || October 7, 1989 || La Silla || E. W. Elst || FLO || align=right | 1.1 km || 
|-id=712 bgcolor=#E9E9E9
| 145712 ||  || — || January 18, 1991 || Haute Provence || E. W. Elst || — || align=right | 4.2 km || 
|-id=713 bgcolor=#fefefe
| 145713 ||  || — || October 6, 1991 || Palomar || A. Lowe || — || align=right | 1.5 km || 
|-id=714 bgcolor=#fefefe
| 145714 ||  || — || February 29, 1992 || La Silla || UESAC || — || align=right | 1.7 km || 
|-id=715 bgcolor=#fefefe
| 145715 ||  || — || February 29, 1992 || La Silla || UESAC || — || align=right | 1.5 km || 
|-id=716 bgcolor=#fefefe
| 145716 ||  || — || March 21, 1993 || La Silla || UESAC || NYS || align=right | 1.4 km || 
|-id=717 bgcolor=#d6d6d6
| 145717 ||  || — || March 19, 1993 || La Silla || UESAC || — || align=right | 3.0 km || 
|-id=718 bgcolor=#d6d6d6
| 145718 ||  || — || March 19, 1993 || La Silla || UESAC || SHU3:2 || align=right | 8.5 km || 
|-id=719 bgcolor=#fefefe
| 145719 ||  || — || March 18, 1993 || La Silla || UESAC || MAS || align=right | 1.1 km || 
|-id=720 bgcolor=#FA8072
| 145720 ||  || — || July 20, 1993 || La Silla || E. W. Elst || — || align=right | 1.9 km || 
|-id=721 bgcolor=#d6d6d6
| 145721 || 1993 PG || — || August 13, 1993 || Kitt Peak || Spacewatch || — || align=right | 6.4 km || 
|-id=722 bgcolor=#fefefe
| 145722 ||  || — || October 11, 1993 || La Silla || E. W. Elst || — || align=right data-sort-value="0.89" | 890 m || 
|-id=723 bgcolor=#E9E9E9
| 145723 || 1993 YT || — || December 21, 1993 || Oizumi || T. Kobayashi || — || align=right | 8.1 km || 
|-id=724 bgcolor=#E9E9E9
| 145724 ||  || — || January 8, 1994 || Kitt Peak || Spacewatch || — || align=right | 3.3 km || 
|-id=725 bgcolor=#E9E9E9
| 145725 ||  || — || February 11, 1994 || Kitt Peak || Spacewatch || — || align=right | 2.1 km || 
|-id=726 bgcolor=#E9E9E9
| 145726 ||  || — || April 3, 1994 || Kitt Peak || Spacewatch || GEF || align=right | 2.0 km || 
|-id=727 bgcolor=#fefefe
| 145727 ||  || — || August 12, 1994 || La Silla || E. W. Elst || MASslow? || align=right | 1.5 km || 
|-id=728 bgcolor=#fefefe
| 145728 || 1994 RO || — || September 7, 1994 || Stroncone || Santa Lucia Obs. || NYS || align=right | 1.1 km || 
|-id=729 bgcolor=#d6d6d6
| 145729 ||  || — || September 5, 1994 || Kitt Peak || Spacewatch || — || align=right | 4.0 km || 
|-id=730 bgcolor=#fefefe
| 145730 ||  || — || October 28, 1994 || Kitt Peak || Spacewatch || — || align=right | 1.3 km || 
|-id=731 bgcolor=#E9E9E9
| 145731 || 1995 AU || — || January 5, 1995 || Oizumi || T. Kobayashi || — || align=right | 4.6 km || 
|-id=732 bgcolor=#E9E9E9
| 145732 Kanmon ||  ||  || February 21, 1995 || Kuma Kogen || A. Nakamura || — || align=right | 1.7 km || 
|-id=733 bgcolor=#E9E9E9
| 145733 ||  || — || February 22, 1995 || Kitt Peak || Spacewatch || — || align=right | 1.1 km || 
|-id=734 bgcolor=#E9E9E9
| 145734 ||  || — || April 25, 1995 || Kitt Peak || Spacewatch || AGN || align=right | 1.9 km || 
|-id=735 bgcolor=#fefefe
| 145735 ||  || — || July 25, 1995 || Kitt Peak || Spacewatch || — || align=right | 1.3 km || 
|-id=736 bgcolor=#d6d6d6
| 145736 ||  || — || September 17, 1995 || Kitt Peak || Spacewatch || — || align=right | 3.1 km || 
|-id=737 bgcolor=#fefefe
| 145737 ||  || — || September 18, 1995 || Kitt Peak || Spacewatch || — || align=right | 1.6 km || 
|-id=738 bgcolor=#fefefe
| 145738 ||  || — || September 19, 1995 || Kitt Peak || Spacewatch || — || align=right | 1.5 km || 
|-id=739 bgcolor=#d6d6d6
| 145739 ||  || — || September 19, 1995 || Kitt Peak || Spacewatch || — || align=right | 6.4 km || 
|-id=740 bgcolor=#fefefe
| 145740 ||  || — || September 27, 1995 || Kitt Peak || Spacewatch || — || align=right | 4.0 km || 
|-id=741 bgcolor=#d6d6d6
| 145741 ||  || — || September 29, 1995 || Kitt Peak || Spacewatch || — || align=right | 3.7 km || 
|-id=742 bgcolor=#fefefe
| 145742 ||  || — || September 19, 1995 || Kitt Peak || Spacewatch || NYS || align=right | 1.1 km || 
|-id=743 bgcolor=#d6d6d6
| 145743 ||  || — || September 30, 1995 || Kitt Peak || Spacewatch || — || align=right | 3.9 km || 
|-id=744 bgcolor=#fefefe
| 145744 ||  || — || October 17, 1995 || Kitt Peak || Spacewatch || NYS || align=right data-sort-value="0.99" | 990 m || 
|-id=745 bgcolor=#fefefe
| 145745 ||  || — || October 17, 1995 || Kitt Peak || Spacewatch || — || align=right | 1.1 km || 
|-id=746 bgcolor=#fefefe
| 145746 ||  || — || October 18, 1995 || Kitt Peak || Spacewatch || FLO || align=right data-sort-value="0.97" | 970 m || 
|-id=747 bgcolor=#d6d6d6
| 145747 ||  || — || October 22, 1995 || Kitt Peak || Spacewatch || KOR || align=right | 2.2 km || 
|-id=748 bgcolor=#fefefe
| 145748 ||  || — || October 17, 1995 || Kitt Peak || Spacewatch || NYS || align=right data-sort-value="0.97" | 970 m || 
|-id=749 bgcolor=#fefefe
| 145749 ||  || — || October 23, 1995 || Kitt Peak || Spacewatch || NYS || align=right | 1.0 km || 
|-id=750 bgcolor=#fefefe
| 145750 ||  || — || November 15, 1995 || Kitt Peak || Spacewatch || V || align=right data-sort-value="0.89" | 890 m || 
|-id=751 bgcolor=#fefefe
| 145751 ||  || — || December 16, 1995 || Kitt Peak || Spacewatch || NYS || align=right | 1.0 km || 
|-id=752 bgcolor=#d6d6d6
| 145752 ||  || — || December 18, 1995 || Kitt Peak || Spacewatch || — || align=right | 4.5 km || 
|-id=753 bgcolor=#fefefe
| 145753 ||  || — || January 12, 1996 || Kitt Peak || Spacewatch || NYS || align=right | 1.6 km || 
|-id=754 bgcolor=#fefefe
| 145754 ||  || — || April 20, 1996 || La Silla || E. W. Elst || — || align=right | 1.6 km || 
|-id=755 bgcolor=#fefefe
| 145755 ||  || — || October 12, 1996 || Kitt Peak || Spacewatch || — || align=right data-sort-value="0.79" | 790 m || 
|-id=756 bgcolor=#E9E9E9
| 145756 ||  || — || October 8, 1996 || La Silla || E. W. Elst || — || align=right | 3.4 km || 
|-id=757 bgcolor=#d6d6d6
| 145757 ||  || — || November 6, 1996 || Kitt Peak || Spacewatch || — || align=right | 4.3 km || 
|-id=758 bgcolor=#fefefe
| 145758 ||  || — || February 1, 1997 || Kitt Peak || Spacewatch || — || align=right | 1.1 km || 
|-id=759 bgcolor=#d6d6d6
| 145759 ||  || — || February 6, 1997 || Kitt Peak || Spacewatch || URS || align=right | 6.6 km || 
|-id=760 bgcolor=#d6d6d6
| 145760 ||  || — || March 2, 1997 || Kitt Peak || Spacewatch || — || align=right | 5.6 km || 
|-id=761 bgcolor=#d6d6d6
| 145761 ||  || — || March 5, 1997 || Kitt Peak || Spacewatch || — || align=right | 4.4 km || 
|-id=762 bgcolor=#fefefe
| 145762 ||  || — || April 3, 1997 || Socorro || LINEAR || NYS || align=right data-sort-value="0.96" | 960 m || 
|-id=763 bgcolor=#fefefe
| 145763 ||  || — || April 3, 1997 || Socorro || LINEAR || — || align=right | 1.7 km || 
|-id=764 bgcolor=#d6d6d6
| 145764 ||  || — || April 12, 1997 || Kitt Peak || Spacewatch || THM || align=right | 3.8 km || 
|-id=765 bgcolor=#fefefe
| 145765 ||  || — || April 29, 1997 || Kitt Peak || Spacewatch || — || align=right | 1.2 km || 
|-id=766 bgcolor=#E9E9E9
| 145766 || 1997 MX || — || June 26, 1997 || Xinglong || SCAP || — || align=right | 2.6 km || 
|-id=767 bgcolor=#d6d6d6
| 145767 || 1997 PW || — || August 3, 1997 || Caussols || ODAS || 3:2 || align=right | 5.0 km || 
|-id=768 bgcolor=#E9E9E9
| 145768 Petiška ||  ||  || August 12, 1997 || Kleť || M. Tichý, Z. Moravec || — || align=right | 1.7 km || 
|-id=769 bgcolor=#E9E9E9
| 145769 ||  || — || September 28, 1997 || Kitt Peak || Spacewatch || — || align=right | 3.2 km || 
|-id=770 bgcolor=#E9E9E9
| 145770 ||  || — || October 13, 1997 || Modra || A. Galád, A. Pravda || — || align=right | 3.3 km || 
|-id=771 bgcolor=#E9E9E9
| 145771 ||  || — || November 1, 1997 || Oizumi || T. Kobayashi || — || align=right | 2.2 km || 
|-id=772 bgcolor=#E9E9E9
| 145772 ||  || — || November 20, 1997 || Kitt Peak || Spacewatch || — || align=right | 2.5 km || 
|-id=773 bgcolor=#E9E9E9
| 145773 ||  || — || November 20, 1997 || Kitt Peak || Spacewatch || — || align=right | 2.1 km || 
|-id=774 bgcolor=#E9E9E9
| 145774 ||  || — || January 22, 1998 || Kitt Peak || Spacewatch || AGN || align=right | 2.2 km || 
|-id=775 bgcolor=#E9E9E9
| 145775 ||  || — || January 22, 1998 || Kitt Peak || Spacewatch || ADE || align=right | 6.4 km || 
|-id=776 bgcolor=#E9E9E9
| 145776 ||  || — || January 22, 1998 || Kitt Peak || Spacewatch || — || align=right | 3.5 km || 
|-id=777 bgcolor=#E9E9E9
| 145777 ||  || — || January 22, 1998 || Kitt Peak || Spacewatch || — || align=right | 4.1 km || 
|-id=778 bgcolor=#E9E9E9
| 145778 ||  || — || January 26, 1998 || Kitt Peak || Spacewatch || — || align=right | 2.8 km || 
|-id=779 bgcolor=#fefefe
| 145779 || 1998 CC || — || February 1, 1998 || Modra || P. Kolény, L. Kornoš || — || align=right data-sort-value="0.6" | 600 m || 
|-id=780 bgcolor=#E9E9E9
| 145780 ||  || — || February 21, 1998 || Xinglong || SCAP || HOF || align=right | 4.6 km || 
|-id=781 bgcolor=#E9E9E9
| 145781 ||  || — || March 20, 1998 || Socorro || LINEAR || — || align=right | 4.7 km || 
|-id=782 bgcolor=#E9E9E9
| 145782 ||  || — || March 29, 1998 || Bologna || E. Colombini || — || align=right | 3.4 km || 
|-id=783 bgcolor=#d6d6d6
| 145783 || 1998 KF || — || May 16, 1998 || Kitt Peak || Spacewatch || — || align=right | 4.9 km || 
|-id=784 bgcolor=#fefefe
| 145784 ||  || — || May 22, 1998 || Anderson Mesa || LONEOS || PHO || align=right | 2.1 km || 
|-id=785 bgcolor=#fefefe
| 145785 ||  || — || June 24, 1998 || Socorro || LINEAR || — || align=right | 2.3 km || 
|-id=786 bgcolor=#fefefe
| 145786 ||  || — || July 26, 1998 || La Silla || E. W. Elst || NYS || align=right | 1.2 km || 
|-id=787 bgcolor=#fefefe
| 145787 ||  || — || August 18, 1998 || Reedy Creek || J. Broughton || NYS || align=right | 1.2 km || 
|-id=788 bgcolor=#d6d6d6
| 145788 ||  || — || August 17, 1998 || Socorro || LINEAR || — || align=right | 5.5 km || 
|-id=789 bgcolor=#fefefe
| 145789 ||  || — || August 17, 1998 || Socorro || LINEAR || NYS || align=right | 1.2 km || 
|-id=790 bgcolor=#fefefe
| 145790 ||  || — || August 17, 1998 || Socorro || LINEAR || V || align=right | 1.4 km || 
|-id=791 bgcolor=#fefefe
| 145791 ||  || — || August 24, 1998 || Socorro || LINEAR || — || align=right | 3.0 km || 
|-id=792 bgcolor=#fefefe
| 145792 ||  || — || August 24, 1998 || Socorro || LINEAR || — || align=right | 1.4 km || 
|-id=793 bgcolor=#fefefe
| 145793 ||  || — || August 19, 1998 || Socorro || LINEAR || — || align=right | 1.6 km || 
|-id=794 bgcolor=#fefefe
| 145794 ||  || — || August 17, 1998 || Socorro || LINEAR || — || align=right | 1.8 km || 
|-id=795 bgcolor=#fefefe
| 145795 ||  || — || September 14, 1998 || Xinglong || SCAP || NYS || align=right | 1.8 km || 
|-id=796 bgcolor=#fefefe
| 145796 ||  || — || September 14, 1998 || Socorro || LINEAR || — || align=right | 1.3 km || 
|-id=797 bgcolor=#fefefe
| 145797 ||  || — || September 14, 1998 || Socorro || LINEAR || — || align=right | 1.7 km || 
|-id=798 bgcolor=#fefefe
| 145798 ||  || — || September 14, 1998 || Socorro || LINEAR || NYS || align=right | 3.0 km || 
|-id=799 bgcolor=#fefefe
| 145799 ||  || — || September 14, 1998 || Socorro || LINEAR || — || align=right | 1.5 km || 
|-id=800 bgcolor=#fefefe
| 145800 ||  || — || September 14, 1998 || Socorro || LINEAR || — || align=right | 1.6 km || 
|}

145801–145900 

|-bgcolor=#fefefe
| 145801 ||  || — || September 14, 1998 || Socorro || LINEAR || — || align=right | 1.9 km || 
|-id=802 bgcolor=#fefefe
| 145802 ||  || — || September 20, 1998 || Kitt Peak || Spacewatch || — || align=right | 1.9 km || 
|-id=803 bgcolor=#E9E9E9
| 145803 ||  || — || September 23, 1998 || Catalina || CSS || — || align=right | 2.8 km || 
|-id=804 bgcolor=#fefefe
| 145804 ||  || — || September 26, 1998 || Kitt Peak || Spacewatch || MAS || align=right data-sort-value="0.95" | 950 m || 
|-id=805 bgcolor=#fefefe
| 145805 ||  || — || September 26, 1998 || Kitt Peak || Spacewatch || V || align=right | 1.3 km || 
|-id=806 bgcolor=#d6d6d6
| 145806 ||  || — || September 26, 1998 || Socorro || LINEAR || Tj (2.96) || align=right | 7.5 km || 
|-id=807 bgcolor=#fefefe
| 145807 ||  || — || September 26, 1998 || Socorro || LINEAR || NYS || align=right | 1.5 km || 
|-id=808 bgcolor=#fefefe
| 145808 ||  || — || September 26, 1998 || Socorro || LINEAR || NYS || align=right | 2.5 km || 
|-id=809 bgcolor=#fefefe
| 145809 ||  || — || September 26, 1998 || Socorro || LINEAR || MAS || align=right | 1.3 km || 
|-id=810 bgcolor=#fefefe
| 145810 ||  || — || September 26, 1998 || Socorro || LINEAR || NYS || align=right | 1.5 km || 
|-id=811 bgcolor=#fefefe
| 145811 ||  || — || September 26, 1998 || Socorro || LINEAR || — || align=right | 1.9 km || 
|-id=812 bgcolor=#E9E9E9
| 145812 ||  || — || September 26, 1998 || Socorro || LINEAR || — || align=right | 2.6 km || 
|-id=813 bgcolor=#E9E9E9
| 145813 ||  || — || September 26, 1998 || Socorro || LINEAR || — || align=right | 3.4 km || 
|-id=814 bgcolor=#E9E9E9
| 145814 ||  || — || September 26, 1998 || Socorro || LINEAR || — || align=right | 1.6 km || 
|-id=815 bgcolor=#fefefe
| 145815 ||  || — || September 26, 1998 || Socorro || LINEAR || — || align=right | 1.2 km || 
|-id=816 bgcolor=#fefefe
| 145816 ||  || — || September 26, 1998 || Socorro || LINEAR || MAS || align=right | 1.5 km || 
|-id=817 bgcolor=#E9E9E9
| 145817 ||  || — || September 26, 1998 || Socorro || LINEAR || — || align=right | 2.0 km || 
|-id=818 bgcolor=#fefefe
| 145818 ||  || — || September 19, 1998 || Anderson Mesa || LONEOS || — || align=right | 1.3 km || 
|-id=819 bgcolor=#fefefe
| 145819 ||  || — || October 12, 1998 || Caussols || ODAS || — || align=right | 1.4 km || 
|-id=820 bgcolor=#fefefe
| 145820 Valeromeo ||  ||  || October 15, 1998 || Ceccano || G. Masi || NYS || align=right | 1.3 km || 
|-id=821 bgcolor=#fefefe
| 145821 ||  || — || October 13, 1998 || Kitt Peak || Spacewatch || — || align=right | 1.4 km || 
|-id=822 bgcolor=#fefefe
| 145822 ||  || — || October 14, 1998 || Xinglong || SCAP || — || align=right | 1.6 km || 
|-id=823 bgcolor=#fefefe
| 145823 ||  || — || October 19, 1998 || Catalina || CSS || H || align=right | 1.1 km || 
|-id=824 bgcolor=#E9E9E9
| 145824 ||  || — || October 28, 1998 || Socorro || LINEAR || — || align=right | 1.9 km || 
|-id=825 bgcolor=#E9E9E9
| 145825 ||  || — || October 28, 1998 || Socorro || LINEAR || — || align=right | 1.2 km || 
|-id=826 bgcolor=#fefefe
| 145826 ||  || — || October 23, 1998 || Xinglong || SCAP || MAS || align=right data-sort-value="0.96" | 960 m || 
|-id=827 bgcolor=#fefefe
| 145827 ||  || — || November 10, 1998 || Socorro || LINEAR || — || align=right | 3.2 km || 
|-id=828 bgcolor=#fefefe
| 145828 ||  || — || November 10, 1998 || Socorro || LINEAR || MAS || align=right | 1.5 km || 
|-id=829 bgcolor=#fefefe
| 145829 ||  || — || November 15, 1998 || Kitt Peak || Spacewatch || — || align=right | 1.2 km || 
|-id=830 bgcolor=#fefefe
| 145830 ||  || — || November 15, 1998 || Kitt Peak || Spacewatch || — || align=right | 1.2 km || 
|-id=831 bgcolor=#fefefe
| 145831 ||  || — || November 14, 1998 || Socorro || LINEAR || — || align=right | 4.6 km || 
|-id=832 bgcolor=#fefefe
| 145832 ||  || — || November 19, 1998 || Catalina || CSS || H || align=right | 1.7 km || 
|-id=833 bgcolor=#d6d6d6
| 145833 ||  || — || November 21, 1998 || Kitt Peak || Spacewatch || SHU3:2 || align=right | 12 km || 
|-id=834 bgcolor=#fefefe
| 145834 ||  || — || November 21, 1998 || Kitt Peak || Spacewatch || — || align=right | 1.1 km || 
|-id=835 bgcolor=#E9E9E9
| 145835 ||  || — || December 11, 1998 || Kitt Peak || Spacewatch || — || align=right | 2.3 km || 
|-id=836 bgcolor=#fefefe
| 145836 ||  || — || December 14, 1998 || Socorro || LINEAR || — || align=right | 4.9 km || 
|-id=837 bgcolor=#fefefe
| 145837 ||  || — || December 16, 1998 || Uenohara || N. Kawasato || NYS || align=right | 1.2 km || 
|-id=838 bgcolor=#E9E9E9
| 145838 ||  || — || December 18, 1998 || Caussols || ODAS || MIS || align=right | 5.0 km || 
|-id=839 bgcolor=#fefefe
| 145839 ||  || — || December 23, 1998 || Goodricke-Pigott || R. A. Tucker || H || align=right | 1.2 km || 
|-id=840 bgcolor=#fefefe
| 145840 ||  || — || December 25, 1998 || Kitt Peak || Spacewatch || NYS || align=right | 1.3 km || 
|-id=841 bgcolor=#d6d6d6
| 145841 ||  || — || December 25, 1998 || Kitt Peak || Spacewatch || 3:2 || align=right | 5.7 km || 
|-id=842 bgcolor=#E9E9E9
| 145842 ||  || — || January 15, 1999 || Kitt Peak || Spacewatch || MRX || align=right | 2.0 km || 
|-id=843 bgcolor=#d6d6d6
| 145843 ||  || — || January 13, 1999 || Višnjan Observatory || K. Korlević || 3:2 || align=right | 7.7 km || 
|-id=844 bgcolor=#E9E9E9
| 145844 ||  || — || January 9, 1999 || Uenohara || N. Kawasato || — || align=right | 1.9 km || 
|-id=845 bgcolor=#E9E9E9
| 145845 ||  || — || January 16, 1999 || Kitt Peak || Spacewatch || — || align=right | 1.5 km || 
|-id=846 bgcolor=#E9E9E9
| 145846 ||  || — || February 14, 1999 || Caussols || ODAS || — || align=right | 2.2 km || 
|-id=847 bgcolor=#E9E9E9
| 145847 ||  || — || February 14, 1999 || Caussols || ODAS || — || align=right | 3.0 km || 
|-id=848 bgcolor=#E9E9E9
| 145848 ||  || — || February 10, 1999 || Socorro || LINEAR || — || align=right | 2.2 km || 
|-id=849 bgcolor=#E9E9E9
| 145849 ||  || — || February 10, 1999 || Socorro || LINEAR || — || align=right | 1.4 km || 
|-id=850 bgcolor=#E9E9E9
| 145850 ||  || — || February 12, 1999 || Socorro || LINEAR || EUN || align=right | 2.5 km || 
|-id=851 bgcolor=#E9E9E9
| 145851 ||  || — || February 12, 1999 || Socorro || LINEAR || — || align=right | 2.6 km || 
|-id=852 bgcolor=#E9E9E9
| 145852 ||  || — || February 10, 1999 || Socorro || LINEAR || — || align=right | 4.3 km || 
|-id=853 bgcolor=#E9E9E9
| 145853 ||  || — || February 10, 1999 || Socorro || LINEAR || — || align=right | 3.0 km || 
|-id=854 bgcolor=#E9E9E9
| 145854 ||  || — || February 10, 1999 || Socorro || LINEAR || — || align=right | 2.2 km || 
|-id=855 bgcolor=#E9E9E9
| 145855 ||  || — || February 12, 1999 || Socorro || LINEAR || — || align=right | 2.2 km || 
|-id=856 bgcolor=#E9E9E9
| 145856 ||  || — || February 12, 1999 || Socorro || LINEAR || — || align=right | 1.6 km || 
|-id=857 bgcolor=#FA8072
| 145857 ||  || — || March 10, 1999 || Socorro || LINEAR || — || align=right | 1.6 km || 
|-id=858 bgcolor=#E9E9E9
| 145858 ||  || — || March 14, 1999 || Kitt Peak || Spacewatch || — || align=right | 2.4 km || 
|-id=859 bgcolor=#E9E9E9
| 145859 ||  || — || May 12, 1999 || Socorro || LINEAR || — || align=right | 3.8 km || 
|-id=860 bgcolor=#d6d6d6
| 145860 ||  || — || May 17, 1999 || Kitt Peak || Spacewatch || KOR || align=right | 2.2 km || 
|-id=861 bgcolor=#E9E9E9
| 145861 ||  || — || June 7, 1999 || Socorro || LINEAR || PAL || align=right | 5.5 km || 
|-id=862 bgcolor=#fefefe
| 145862 ||  || — || June 22, 1999 || Catalina || CSS || — || align=right | 1.4 km || 
|-id=863 bgcolor=#E9E9E9
| 145863 ||  || — || July 14, 1999 || Socorro || LINEAR || — || align=right | 4.8 km || 
|-id=864 bgcolor=#E9E9E9
| 145864 ||  || — || July 14, 1999 || Socorro || LINEAR || — || align=right | 6.5 km || 
|-id=865 bgcolor=#fefefe
| 145865 ||  || — || September 4, 1999 || Catalina || CSS || — || align=right | 1.3 km || 
|-id=866 bgcolor=#d6d6d6
| 145866 ||  || — || September 7, 1999 || Socorro || LINEAR || — || align=right | 5.2 km || 
|-id=867 bgcolor=#fefefe
| 145867 ||  || — || September 9, 1999 || Socorro || LINEAR || — || align=right | 1.8 km || 
|-id=868 bgcolor=#fefefe
| 145868 ||  || — || September 9, 1999 || Socorro || LINEAR || — || align=right | 1.1 km || 
|-id=869 bgcolor=#fefefe
| 145869 ||  || — || September 9, 1999 || Socorro || LINEAR || — || align=right | 1.4 km || 
|-id=870 bgcolor=#fefefe
| 145870 ||  || — || September 9, 1999 || Socorro || LINEAR || FLO || align=right | 1.1 km || 
|-id=871 bgcolor=#fefefe
| 145871 ||  || — || September 9, 1999 || Socorro || LINEAR || FLO || align=right | 1.2 km || 
|-id=872 bgcolor=#d6d6d6
| 145872 ||  || — || September 13, 1999 || Kitt Peak || Spacewatch || THM || align=right | 4.6 km || 
|-id=873 bgcolor=#fefefe
| 145873 ||  || — || September 5, 1999 || Anderson Mesa || LONEOS || — || align=right | 1.4 km || 
|-id=874 bgcolor=#fefefe
| 145874 ||  || — || September 8, 1999 || Catalina || CSS || — || align=right | 1.1 km || 
|-id=875 bgcolor=#d6d6d6
| 145875 ||  || — || September 6, 1999 || Kitt Peak || Spacewatch || — || align=right | 4.6 km || 
|-id=876 bgcolor=#fefefe
| 145876 ||  || — || September 4, 1999 || Anderson Mesa || LONEOS || FLO || align=right | 1.3 km || 
|-id=877 bgcolor=#FA8072
| 145877 ||  || — || September 30, 1999 || Catalina || CSS || — || align=right | 1.3 km || 
|-id=878 bgcolor=#d6d6d6
| 145878 ||  || — || September 29, 1999 || Catalina || CSS || — || align=right | 3.1 km || 
|-id=879 bgcolor=#d6d6d6
| 145879 ||  || — || September 18, 1999 || Kitt Peak || Spacewatch || — || align=right | 4.4 km || 
|-id=880 bgcolor=#fefefe
| 145880 || 1999 TE || — || October 1, 1999 || High Point || D. K. Chesney || — || align=right | 1.5 km || 
|-id=881 bgcolor=#fefefe
| 145881 ||  || — || October 4, 1999 || Socorro || LINEAR || V || align=right | 1.3 km || 
|-id=882 bgcolor=#fefefe
| 145882 ||  || — || October 4, 1999 || Socorro || LINEAR || — || align=right | 1.3 km || 
|-id=883 bgcolor=#fefefe
| 145883 ||  || — || October 4, 1999 || Kitt Peak || Spacewatch || V || align=right data-sort-value="0.92" | 920 m || 
|-id=884 bgcolor=#d6d6d6
| 145884 ||  || — || October 13, 1999 || Kitt Peak || Spacewatch || HYG || align=right | 4.0 km || 
|-id=885 bgcolor=#fefefe
| 145885 ||  || — || October 15, 1999 || Kitt Peak || Spacewatch || — || align=right | 1.00 km || 
|-id=886 bgcolor=#fefefe
| 145886 ||  || — || October 2, 1999 || Socorro || LINEAR || — || align=right | 1.6 km || 
|-id=887 bgcolor=#fefefe
| 145887 ||  || — || October 2, 1999 || Socorro || LINEAR || FLO || align=right | 1.3 km || 
|-id=888 bgcolor=#FA8072
| 145888 ||  || — || October 3, 1999 || Socorro || LINEAR || — || align=right | 1.6 km || 
|-id=889 bgcolor=#fefefe
| 145889 ||  || — || October 4, 1999 || Socorro || LINEAR || — || align=right | 1.2 km || 
|-id=890 bgcolor=#fefefe
| 145890 ||  || — || October 6, 1999 || Socorro || LINEAR || — || align=right | 1.1 km || 
|-id=891 bgcolor=#fefefe
| 145891 ||  || — || October 7, 1999 || Socorro || LINEAR || — || align=right | 1.3 km || 
|-id=892 bgcolor=#fefefe
| 145892 ||  || — || October 15, 1999 || Socorro || LINEAR || — || align=right data-sort-value="0.94" | 940 m || 
|-id=893 bgcolor=#fefefe
| 145893 ||  || — || October 10, 1999 || Socorro || LINEAR || FLO || align=right | 1.1 km || 
|-id=894 bgcolor=#d6d6d6
| 145894 ||  || — || October 10, 1999 || Socorro || LINEAR || VER || align=right | 6.1 km || 
|-id=895 bgcolor=#fefefe
| 145895 ||  || — || October 10, 1999 || Socorro || LINEAR || — || align=right | 1.1 km || 
|-id=896 bgcolor=#fefefe
| 145896 ||  || — || October 12, 1999 || Socorro || LINEAR || — || align=right | 2.9 km || 
|-id=897 bgcolor=#fefefe
| 145897 ||  || — || October 12, 1999 || Socorro || LINEAR || — || align=right | 1.5 km || 
|-id=898 bgcolor=#fefefe
| 145898 ||  || — || October 12, 1999 || Socorro || LINEAR || FLO || align=right | 1.4 km || 
|-id=899 bgcolor=#fefefe
| 145899 ||  || — || October 12, 1999 || Socorro || LINEAR || FLO || align=right | 1.1 km || 
|-id=900 bgcolor=#fefefe
| 145900 ||  || — || October 1, 1999 || Catalina || CSS || — || align=right | 1.3 km || 
|}

145901–146000 

|-bgcolor=#fefefe
| 145901 ||  || — || October 4, 1999 || Kitt Peak || Spacewatch || — || align=right | 1.1 km || 
|-id=902 bgcolor=#fefefe
| 145902 ||  || — || October 4, 1999 || Catalina || CSS || — || align=right | 1.0 km || 
|-id=903 bgcolor=#fefefe
| 145903 ||  || — || October 8, 1999 || Catalina || CSS || — || align=right | 1.6 km || 
|-id=904 bgcolor=#d6d6d6
| 145904 ||  || — || October 9, 1999 || Catalina || CSS || ALA || align=right | 7.2 km || 
|-id=905 bgcolor=#fefefe
| 145905 ||  || — || October 3, 1999 || Socorro || LINEAR || — || align=right | 1.3 km || 
|-id=906 bgcolor=#fefefe
| 145906 ||  || — || October 3, 1999 || Socorro || LINEAR || — || align=right | 1.6 km || 
|-id=907 bgcolor=#fefefe
| 145907 ||  || — || October 3, 1999 || Socorro || LINEAR || FLO || align=right | 1.2 km || 
|-id=908 bgcolor=#d6d6d6
| 145908 ||  || — || October 2, 1999 || Kitt Peak || Spacewatch || HYG || align=right | 4.2 km || 
|-id=909 bgcolor=#fefefe
| 145909 ||  || — || October 10, 1999 || Socorro || LINEAR || FLO || align=right | 1.5 km || 
|-id=910 bgcolor=#fefefe
| 145910 || 1999 UB || — || October 16, 1999 || Ondřejov || P. Kušnirák, P. Pravec || — || align=right | 1.5 km || 
|-id=911 bgcolor=#FA8072
| 145911 ||  || — || October 31, 1999 || Socorro || LINEAR || PHO || align=right | 2.0 km || 
|-id=912 bgcolor=#fefefe
| 145912 ||  || — || October 31, 1999 || Kitt Peak || Spacewatch || FLO || align=right data-sort-value="0.79" | 790 m || 
|-id=913 bgcolor=#fefefe
| 145913 ||  || — || October 28, 1999 || Catalina || CSS || FLO || align=right | 1.2 km || 
|-id=914 bgcolor=#fefefe
| 145914 ||  || — || October 28, 1999 || Catalina || CSS || — || align=right | 1.3 km || 
|-id=915 bgcolor=#fefefe
| 145915 ||  || — || October 29, 1999 || Anderson Mesa || LONEOS || — || align=right | 1.8 km || 
|-id=916 bgcolor=#fefefe
| 145916 ||  || — || October 29, 1999 || Kitt Peak || Spacewatch || FLO || align=right | 1.00 km || 
|-id=917 bgcolor=#fefefe
| 145917 ||  || — || November 3, 1999 || Socorro || LINEAR || FLO || align=right | 1.1 km || 
|-id=918 bgcolor=#fefefe
| 145918 ||  || — || November 5, 1999 || Kitt Peak || Spacewatch || — || align=right | 1.1 km || 
|-id=919 bgcolor=#fefefe
| 145919 ||  || — || November 9, 1999 || Socorro || LINEAR || — || align=right | 1.4 km || 
|-id=920 bgcolor=#fefefe
| 145920 ||  || — || November 11, 1999 || Kitt Peak || Spacewatch || — || align=right | 1.3 km || 
|-id=921 bgcolor=#fefefe
| 145921 ||  || — || November 12, 1999 || Socorro || LINEAR || FLO || align=right | 2.0 km || 
|-id=922 bgcolor=#fefefe
| 145922 ||  || — || November 9, 1999 || Kitt Peak || Spacewatch || — || align=right | 1.1 km || 
|-id=923 bgcolor=#fefefe
| 145923 ||  || — || November 14, 1999 || Socorro || LINEAR || V || align=right data-sort-value="0.86" | 860 m || 
|-id=924 bgcolor=#fefefe
| 145924 ||  || — || November 15, 1999 || Socorro || LINEAR || — || align=right | 1.3 km || 
|-id=925 bgcolor=#fefefe
| 145925 ||  || — || November 3, 1999 || Socorro || LINEAR || FLO || align=right data-sort-value="0.89" | 890 m || 
|-id=926 bgcolor=#fefefe
| 145926 ||  || — || November 4, 1999 || Socorro || LINEAR || FLO || align=right | 1.3 km || 
|-id=927 bgcolor=#fefefe
| 145927 ||  || — || November 3, 1999 || Socorro || LINEAR || FLO || align=right | 1.00 km || 
|-id=928 bgcolor=#fefefe
| 145928 ||  || — || November 28, 1999 || Kitt Peak || Spacewatch || NYS || align=right | 1.0 km || 
|-id=929 bgcolor=#fefefe
| 145929 ||  || — || November 28, 1999 || Kitt Peak || Spacewatch || — || align=right | 1.3 km || 
|-id=930 bgcolor=#fefefe
| 145930 ||  || — || November 28, 1999 || Kitt Peak || Spacewatch || EUT || align=right | 1.0 km || 
|-id=931 bgcolor=#fefefe
| 145931 ||  || — || December 4, 1999 || Catalina || CSS || fast? || align=right | 1.2 km || 
|-id=932 bgcolor=#fefefe
| 145932 ||  || — || December 7, 1999 || Socorro || LINEAR || — || align=right | 1.8 km || 
|-id=933 bgcolor=#fefefe
| 145933 ||  || — || December 7, 1999 || Socorro || LINEAR || PHO || align=right | 1.7 km || 
|-id=934 bgcolor=#fefefe
| 145934 ||  || — || December 7, 1999 || Socorro || LINEAR || V || align=right | 1.3 km || 
|-id=935 bgcolor=#fefefe
| 145935 ||  || — || December 7, 1999 || Socorro || LINEAR || FLO || align=right data-sort-value="0.97" | 970 m || 
|-id=936 bgcolor=#fefefe
| 145936 ||  || — || December 7, 1999 || Socorro || LINEAR || — || align=right data-sort-value="0.95" | 950 m || 
|-id=937 bgcolor=#fefefe
| 145937 ||  || — || December 7, 1999 || Socorro || LINEAR || — || align=right | 1.2 km || 
|-id=938 bgcolor=#fefefe
| 145938 ||  || — || December 7, 1999 || Socorro || LINEAR || — || align=right | 1.7 km || 
|-id=939 bgcolor=#fefefe
| 145939 ||  || — || December 7, 1999 || Socorro || LINEAR || FLO || align=right | 1.3 km || 
|-id=940 bgcolor=#fefefe
| 145940 ||  || — || December 7, 1999 || Socorro || LINEAR || — || align=right | 1.5 km || 
|-id=941 bgcolor=#fefefe
| 145941 ||  || — || December 7, 1999 || Socorro || LINEAR || FLO || align=right | 2.2 km || 
|-id=942 bgcolor=#fefefe
| 145942 ||  || — || December 7, 1999 || Socorro || LINEAR || NYS || align=right | 1.0 km || 
|-id=943 bgcolor=#fefefe
| 145943 ||  || — || December 7, 1999 || Socorro || LINEAR || V || align=right | 1.3 km || 
|-id=944 bgcolor=#fefefe
| 145944 ||  || — || December 7, 1999 || Catalina || CSS || FLO || align=right | 1.3 km || 
|-id=945 bgcolor=#fefefe
| 145945 ||  || — || December 9, 1999 || Fountain Hills || C. W. Juels || — || align=right | 2.1 km || 
|-id=946 bgcolor=#fefefe
| 145946 ||  || — || December 7, 1999 || Kitt Peak || Spacewatch || — || align=right | 1.6 km || 
|-id=947 bgcolor=#fefefe
| 145947 ||  || — || December 10, 1999 || Socorro || LINEAR || — || align=right | 1.7 km || 
|-id=948 bgcolor=#fefefe
| 145948 ||  || — || December 12, 1999 || Socorro || LINEAR || — || align=right | 1.5 km || 
|-id=949 bgcolor=#fefefe
| 145949 ||  || — || December 12, 1999 || Socorro || LINEAR || FLO || align=right | 1.2 km || 
|-id=950 bgcolor=#fefefe
| 145950 ||  || — || December 12, 1999 || Socorro || LINEAR || FLO || align=right | 1.2 km || 
|-id=951 bgcolor=#fefefe
| 145951 ||  || — || December 12, 1999 || Socorro || LINEAR || — || align=right | 2.0 km || 
|-id=952 bgcolor=#fefefe
| 145952 ||  || — || December 12, 1999 || Socorro || LINEAR || V || align=right | 1.4 km || 
|-id=953 bgcolor=#fefefe
| 145953 ||  || — || December 13, 1999 || Kitt Peak || Spacewatch || FLO || align=right | 1.5 km || 
|-id=954 bgcolor=#fefefe
| 145954 ||  || — || December 13, 1999 || Kitt Peak || Spacewatch || NYS || align=right | 1.5 km || 
|-id=955 bgcolor=#fefefe
| 145955 ||  || — || December 15, 1999 || Kitt Peak || Spacewatch || MAS || align=right | 1.1 km || 
|-id=956 bgcolor=#fefefe
| 145956 ||  || — || December 4, 1999 || Anderson Mesa || LONEOS || — || align=right | 1.5 km || 
|-id=957 bgcolor=#fefefe
| 145957 ||  || — || December 5, 1999 || Socorro || LINEAR || FLO || align=right | 1.3 km || 
|-id=958 bgcolor=#fefefe
| 145958 ||  || — || December 6, 1999 || Socorro || LINEAR || FLO || align=right | 1.1 km || 
|-id=959 bgcolor=#fefefe
| 145959 ||  || — || December 6, 1999 || Socorro || LINEAR || — || align=right | 1.2 km || 
|-id=960 bgcolor=#d6d6d6
| 145960 ||  || — || December 5, 1999 || Kitt Peak || Spacewatch || SHU3:2 || align=right | 7.1 km || 
|-id=961 bgcolor=#fefefe
| 145961 ||  || — || December 9, 1999 || Kitt Peak || Spacewatch || — || align=right | 1.2 km || 
|-id=962 bgcolor=#FA8072
| 145962 Lacchini ||  ||  || December 29, 1999 || Colleverde || V. S. Casulli || — || align=right | 2.2 km || 
|-id=963 bgcolor=#FA8072
| 145963 ||  || — || December 30, 1999 || Socorro || LINEAR || — || align=right | 1.9 km || 
|-id=964 bgcolor=#fefefe
| 145964 ||  || — || December 27, 1999 || Kitt Peak || Spacewatch || — || align=right | 1.8 km || 
|-id=965 bgcolor=#fefefe
| 145965 ||  || — || December 27, 1999 || Kitt Peak || Spacewatch || MAS || align=right data-sort-value="0.94" | 940 m || 
|-id=966 bgcolor=#fefefe
| 145966 ||  || — || December 30, 1999 || San Marcello || M. Tombelli, A. Boattini || — || align=right | 1.3 km || 
|-id=967 bgcolor=#fefefe
| 145967 ||  || — || January 3, 2000 || Socorro || LINEAR || V || align=right | 1.1 km || 
|-id=968 bgcolor=#fefefe
| 145968 ||  || — || January 3, 2000 || Socorro || LINEAR || — || align=right | 1.6 km || 
|-id=969 bgcolor=#fefefe
| 145969 ||  || — || January 3, 2000 || Socorro || LINEAR || NYS || align=right | 1.1 km || 
|-id=970 bgcolor=#fefefe
| 145970 ||  || — || January 3, 2000 || Socorro || LINEAR || NYS || align=right | 1.4 km || 
|-id=971 bgcolor=#fefefe
| 145971 ||  || — || January 3, 2000 || Socorro || LINEAR || fast? || align=right | 1.6 km || 
|-id=972 bgcolor=#fefefe
| 145972 ||  || — || January 3, 2000 || Socorro || LINEAR || V || align=right | 1.6 km || 
|-id=973 bgcolor=#fefefe
| 145973 ||  || — || January 2, 2000 || Kitt Peak || Spacewatch || MAS || align=right data-sort-value="0.90" | 900 m || 
|-id=974 bgcolor=#fefefe
| 145974 ||  || — || January 4, 2000 || Socorro || LINEAR || ERI || align=right | 3.1 km || 
|-id=975 bgcolor=#fefefe
| 145975 ||  || — || January 4, 2000 || Socorro || LINEAR || V || align=right | 1.5 km || 
|-id=976 bgcolor=#fefefe
| 145976 ||  || — || January 4, 2000 || Socorro || LINEAR || — || align=right | 2.6 km || 
|-id=977 bgcolor=#fefefe
| 145977 ||  || — || January 5, 2000 || Socorro || LINEAR || FLO || align=right | 1.5 km || 
|-id=978 bgcolor=#fefefe
| 145978 ||  || — || January 2, 2000 || Socorro || LINEAR || PHO || align=right | 2.3 km || 
|-id=979 bgcolor=#fefefe
| 145979 ||  || — || January 5, 2000 || Socorro || LINEAR || — || align=right | 1.3 km || 
|-id=980 bgcolor=#fefefe
| 145980 ||  || — || January 8, 2000 || Socorro || LINEAR || PHO || align=right | 3.8 km || 
|-id=981 bgcolor=#fefefe
| 145981 ||  || — || January 3, 2000 || Socorro || LINEAR || — || align=right | 1.4 km || 
|-id=982 bgcolor=#fefefe
| 145982 ||  || — || January 3, 2000 || Socorro || LINEAR || — || align=right | 1.7 km || 
|-id=983 bgcolor=#fefefe
| 145983 ||  || — || January 4, 2000 || Socorro || LINEAR || — || align=right | 1.5 km || 
|-id=984 bgcolor=#fefefe
| 145984 ||  || — || January 6, 2000 || Kitt Peak || Spacewatch || — || align=right | 1.1 km || 
|-id=985 bgcolor=#fefefe
| 145985 ||  || — || January 7, 2000 || Kitt Peak || Spacewatch || NYS || align=right | 1.4 km || 
|-id=986 bgcolor=#fefefe
| 145986 ||  || — || January 11, 2000 || Kitt Peak || Spacewatch || NYS || align=right data-sort-value="0.94" | 940 m || 
|-id=987 bgcolor=#fefefe
| 145987 ||  || — || January 13, 2000 || Kitt Peak || Spacewatch || FLO || align=right | 1.6 km || 
|-id=988 bgcolor=#fefefe
| 145988 ||  || — || January 26, 2000 || Gnosca || S. Sposetti || — || align=right | 1.6 km || 
|-id=989 bgcolor=#fefefe
| 145989 ||  || — || January 30, 2000 || Tebbutt || F. B. Zoltowski || — || align=right | 1.4 km || 
|-id=990 bgcolor=#fefefe
| 145990 ||  || — || January 29, 2000 || Kitt Peak || Spacewatch || — || align=right | 1.4 km || 
|-id=991 bgcolor=#fefefe
| 145991 ||  || — || January 30, 2000 || Catalina || CSS || — || align=right | 1.7 km || 
|-id=992 bgcolor=#fefefe
| 145992 ||  || — || February 2, 2000 || Socorro || LINEAR || NYS || align=right | 1.1 km || 
|-id=993 bgcolor=#fefefe
| 145993 ||  || — || February 2, 2000 || Socorro || LINEAR || — || align=right | 1.2 km || 
|-id=994 bgcolor=#fefefe
| 145994 ||  || — || February 2, 2000 || Socorro || LINEAR || FLO || align=right | 1.7 km || 
|-id=995 bgcolor=#fefefe
| 145995 ||  || — || February 2, 2000 || Socorro || LINEAR || NYS || align=right | 1.1 km || 
|-id=996 bgcolor=#fefefe
| 145996 ||  || — || February 2, 2000 || Socorro || LINEAR || — || align=right | 1.7 km || 
|-id=997 bgcolor=#fefefe
| 145997 ||  || — || February 2, 2000 || Socorro || LINEAR || NYS || align=right data-sort-value="0.88" | 880 m || 
|-id=998 bgcolor=#fefefe
| 145998 ||  || — || February 2, 2000 || Socorro || LINEAR || V || align=right | 1.2 km || 
|-id=999 bgcolor=#fefefe
| 145999 ||  || — || February 2, 2000 || Socorro || LINEAR || MAS || align=right | 1.1 km || 
|-id=000 bgcolor=#fefefe
| 146000 ||  || — || February 2, 2000 || Socorro || LINEAR || PHO || align=right | 2.5 km || 
|}

References

External links 
 Discovery Circumstances: Numbered Minor Planets (145001)–(150000) (IAU Minor Planet Center)

0145